

555001–555100 

|-bgcolor=#fefefe
| 555001 ||  || — || May 7, 2013 || Kitt Peak || Spacewatch ||  || align=right data-sort-value="0.79" | 790 m || 
|-id=002 bgcolor=#E9E9E9
| 555002 ||  || — || May 16, 2013 || Haleakala || Pan-STARRS ||  || align=right data-sort-value="0.99" | 990 m || 
|-id=003 bgcolor=#fefefe
| 555003 ||  || — || June 12, 2013 || Haleakala || Pan-STARRS || H || align=right data-sort-value="0.56" | 560 m || 
|-id=004 bgcolor=#E9E9E9
| 555004 ||  || — || May 16, 2013 || Nogales || M. Schwartz, P. R. Holvorcem ||  || align=right | 1.8 km || 
|-id=005 bgcolor=#E9E9E9
| 555005 ||  || — || July 18, 2001 || Palomar || NEAT ||  || align=right data-sort-value="0.98" | 980 m || 
|-id=006 bgcolor=#E9E9E9
| 555006 ||  || — || June 8, 2013 || Siding Spring || SSS ||  || align=right | 1.6 km || 
|-id=007 bgcolor=#d6d6d6
| 555007 ||  || — || June 7, 2013 || Haleakala || Pan-STARRS ||  || align=right | 2.1 km || 
|-id=008 bgcolor=#E9E9E9
| 555008 ||  || — || June 1, 2013 || Catalina || CSS ||  || align=right | 1.0 km || 
|-id=009 bgcolor=#d6d6d6
| 555009 ||  || — || June 20, 2013 || Haleakala || Pan-STARRS ||  || align=right | 2.1 km || 
|-id=010 bgcolor=#E9E9E9
| 555010 ||  || — || June 20, 2013 || Haleakala || Pan-STARRS ||  || align=right | 1.3 km || 
|-id=011 bgcolor=#E9E9E9
| 555011 ||  || — || June 18, 2013 || Haleakala || Pan-STARRS ||  || align=right | 1.2 km || 
|-id=012 bgcolor=#E9E9E9
| 555012 ||  || — || February 9, 2008 || Kitt Peak || Spacewatch ||  || align=right data-sort-value="0.95" | 950 m || 
|-id=013 bgcolor=#fefefe
| 555013 ||  || — || February 5, 2007 || Palomar || NEAT || H || align=right data-sort-value="0.58" | 580 m || 
|-id=014 bgcolor=#fefefe
| 555014 ||  || — || July 4, 2013 || Haleakala || Pan-STARRS || H || align=right data-sort-value="0.77" | 770 m || 
|-id=015 bgcolor=#FA8072
| 555015 ||  || — || March 9, 2000 || Socorro || LINEAR ||  || align=right | 1.5 km || 
|-id=016 bgcolor=#d6d6d6
| 555016 ||  || — || December 25, 2003 || Kitt Peak || Spacewatch ||  || align=right | 4.4 km || 
|-id=017 bgcolor=#FA8072
| 555017 ||  || — || June 8, 2004 || Palomar || NEAT ||  || align=right | 2.6 km || 
|-id=018 bgcolor=#d6d6d6
| 555018 ||  || — || July 1, 2013 || Haleakala || Pan-STARRS || SHU3:2 || align=right | 5.2 km || 
|-id=019 bgcolor=#fefefe
| 555019 ||  || — || March 4, 2006 || Mount Lemmon || Mount Lemmon Survey ||  || align=right data-sort-value="0.51" | 510 m || 
|-id=020 bgcolor=#d6d6d6
| 555020 ||  || — || April 18, 2007 || Mount Lemmon || Mount Lemmon Survey ||  || align=right | 1.8 km || 
|-id=021 bgcolor=#E9E9E9
| 555021 ||  || — || September 28, 2009 || Mount Lemmon || Mount Lemmon Survey ||  || align=right | 1.6 km || 
|-id=022 bgcolor=#d6d6d6
| 555022 ||  || — || July 15, 2013 || Haleakala || Pan-STARRS ||  || align=right | 1.7 km || 
|-id=023 bgcolor=#d6d6d6
| 555023 ||  || — || July 14, 2013 || Haleakala || Pan-STARRS ||  || align=right | 2.3 km || 
|-id=024 bgcolor=#d6d6d6
| 555024 ||  || — || July 15, 2013 || Haleakala || Pan-STARRS ||  || align=right | 1.8 km || 
|-id=025 bgcolor=#E9E9E9
| 555025 ||  || — || July 14, 2013 || Haleakala || Pan-STARRS ||  || align=right | 1.7 km || 
|-id=026 bgcolor=#E9E9E9
| 555026 ||  || — || February 15, 2016 || Mount Lemmon || Mount Lemmon Survey ||  || align=right | 1.2 km || 
|-id=027 bgcolor=#E9E9E9
| 555027 ||  || — || July 15, 2013 || Haleakala || Pan-STARRS ||  || align=right | 1.4 km || 
|-id=028 bgcolor=#E9E9E9
| 555028 ||  || — || July 13, 2013 || Mount Lemmon || Mount Lemmon Survey ||  || align=right | 1.6 km || 
|-id=029 bgcolor=#E9E9E9
| 555029 ||  || — || July 13, 2013 || Haleakala || Pan-STARRS ||  || align=right data-sort-value="0.81" | 810 m || 
|-id=030 bgcolor=#E9E9E9
| 555030 ||  || — || August 31, 2009 || Siding Spring || SSS ||  || align=right | 2.0 km || 
|-id=031 bgcolor=#E9E9E9
| 555031 ||  || — || July 1, 2013 || Haleakala || Pan-STARRS ||  || align=right | 1.7 km || 
|-id=032 bgcolor=#E9E9E9
| 555032 ||  || — || December 2, 2005 || Catalina || CSS ||  || align=right | 3.1 km || 
|-id=033 bgcolor=#E9E9E9
| 555033 ||  || — || June 3, 2013 || Mount Lemmon || Mount Lemmon Survey ||  || align=right | 1.2 km || 
|-id=034 bgcolor=#C2FFFF
| 555034 ||  || — || August 26, 2012 || Kitt Peak || Spacewatch || L5 || align=right | 8.2 km || 
|-id=035 bgcolor=#fefefe
| 555035 ||  || — || June 25, 2017 || Haleakala || Pan-STARRS ||  || align=right data-sort-value="0.93" | 930 m || 
|-id=036 bgcolor=#d6d6d6
| 555036 ||  || — || July 18, 2013 || Haleakala || Pan-STARRS ||  || align=right | 2.3 km || 
|-id=037 bgcolor=#d6d6d6
| 555037 ||  || — || July 16, 2013 || Haleakala || Pan-STARRS ||  || align=right | 2.1 km || 
|-id=038 bgcolor=#d6d6d6
| 555038 ||  || — || July 16, 2013 || Haleakala || Pan-STARRS ||  || align=right | 2.7 km || 
|-id=039 bgcolor=#E9E9E9
| 555039 ||  || — || July 16, 2013 || Haleakala || Pan-STARRS ||  || align=right | 2.2 km || 
|-id=040 bgcolor=#E9E9E9
| 555040 ||  || — || September 22, 2009 || Mount Lemmon || Mount Lemmon Survey ||  || align=right | 1.4 km || 
|-id=041 bgcolor=#E9E9E9
| 555041 ||  || — || July 13, 2013 || Haleakala || Pan-STARRS ||  || align=right | 2.7 km || 
|-id=042 bgcolor=#E9E9E9
| 555042 ||  || — || June 19, 2013 || Mount Lemmon || Mount Lemmon Survey ||  || align=right | 1.9 km || 
|-id=043 bgcolor=#E9E9E9
| 555043 ||  || — || July 2, 2008 || Kitt Peak || Spacewatch ||  || align=right | 2.0 km || 
|-id=044 bgcolor=#d6d6d6
| 555044 ||  || — || August 8, 2013 || Haleakala || Pan-STARRS ||  || align=right | 2.0 km || 
|-id=045 bgcolor=#E9E9E9
| 555045 ||  || — || March 20, 2007 || Kitt Peak || Spacewatch ||  || align=right | 1.5 km || 
|-id=046 bgcolor=#E9E9E9
| 555046 ||  || — || November 24, 2009 || Kitt Peak || Spacewatch ||  || align=right | 1.7 km || 
|-id=047 bgcolor=#E9E9E9
| 555047 ||  || — || March 11, 2003 || Palomar || NEAT ||  || align=right | 1.7 km || 
|-id=048 bgcolor=#E9E9E9
| 555048 ||  || — || August 9, 2013 || Haleakala || Pan-STARRS ||  || align=right | 2.1 km || 
|-id=049 bgcolor=#E9E9E9
| 555049 ||  || — || September 18, 2009 || Kitt Peak || Spacewatch ||  || align=right | 1.2 km || 
|-id=050 bgcolor=#E9E9E9
| 555050 ||  || — || June 20, 2013 || Haleakala || Pan-STARRS ||  || align=right | 1.4 km || 
|-id=051 bgcolor=#d6d6d6
| 555051 ||  || — || August 15, 2013 || Haleakala || Pan-STARRS ||  || align=right | 2.2 km || 
|-id=052 bgcolor=#E9E9E9
| 555052 ||  || — || April 15, 2012 || Haleakala || Pan-STARRS ||  || align=right | 1.4 km || 
|-id=053 bgcolor=#E9E9E9
| 555053 ||  || — || July 15, 2013 || Haleakala || Pan-STARRS ||  || align=right | 1.5 km || 
|-id=054 bgcolor=#E9E9E9
| 555054 ||  || — || January 2, 2006 || Mount Lemmon || Mount Lemmon Survey ||  || align=right | 1.6 km || 
|-id=055 bgcolor=#d6d6d6
| 555055 ||  || — || March 26, 2006 || Kitt Peak || Spacewatch ||  || align=right | 2.7 km || 
|-id=056 bgcolor=#E9E9E9
| 555056 ||  || — || March 2, 2011 || Mount Lemmon || Mount Lemmon Survey ||  || align=right | 1.7 km || 
|-id=057 bgcolor=#E9E9E9
| 555057 ||  || — || August 10, 2013 || Kitt Peak || Spacewatch ||  || align=right | 2.0 km || 
|-id=058 bgcolor=#E9E9E9
| 555058 ||  || — || August 21, 2004 || Siding Spring || SSS ||  || align=right | 1.4 km || 
|-id=059 bgcolor=#d6d6d6
| 555059 ||  || — || March 2, 2011 || Mount Lemmon || Mount Lemmon Survey ||  || align=right | 2.1 km || 
|-id=060 bgcolor=#d6d6d6
| 555060 ||  || — || August 8, 2013 || Kitt Peak || Spacewatch ||  || align=right | 1.9 km || 
|-id=061 bgcolor=#d6d6d6
| 555061 ||  || — || February 21, 2006 || Mount Lemmon || Mount Lemmon Survey ||  || align=right | 1.7 km || 
|-id=062 bgcolor=#E9E9E9
| 555062 ||  || — || February 25, 2011 || Kitt Peak || Mount Lemmon Survey ||  || align=right | 1.7 km || 
|-id=063 bgcolor=#d6d6d6
| 555063 ||  || — || August 15, 2013 || Haleakala || Pan-STARRS ||  || align=right | 1.6 km || 
|-id=064 bgcolor=#E9E9E9
| 555064 ||  || — || August 8, 2013 || Kitt Peak || Spacewatch ||  || align=right | 1.5 km || 
|-id=065 bgcolor=#E9E9E9
| 555065 ||  || — || November 26, 2014 || Haleakala || Pan-STARRS ||  || align=right | 1.7 km || 
|-id=066 bgcolor=#E9E9E9
| 555066 ||  || — || August 13, 2013 || Palomar || PTF ||  || align=right | 2.1 km || 
|-id=067 bgcolor=#d6d6d6
| 555067 ||  || — || August 12, 2013 || Haleakala || Pan-STARRS ||  || align=right | 1.6 km || 
|-id=068 bgcolor=#d6d6d6
| 555068 ||  || — || August 15, 2013 || Haleakala || Pan-STARRS ||  || align=right | 1.5 km || 
|-id=069 bgcolor=#E9E9E9
| 555069 ||  || — || August 15, 2013 || Haleakala || Pan-STARRS ||  || align=right | 1.6 km || 
|-id=070 bgcolor=#E9E9E9
| 555070 ||  || — || October 25, 2005 || Kitt Peak || Spacewatch ||  || align=right | 1.2 km || 
|-id=071 bgcolor=#d6d6d6
| 555071 ||  || — || August 14, 2013 || Haleakala || Pan-STARRS ||  || align=right | 1.6 km || 
|-id=072 bgcolor=#E9E9E9
| 555072 ||  || — || August 12, 2013 || Haleakala || Pan-STARRS ||  || align=right | 1.2 km || 
|-id=073 bgcolor=#E9E9E9
| 555073 ||  || — || August 10, 2013 || Kitt Peak || Spacewatch ||  || align=right | 1.7 km || 
|-id=074 bgcolor=#E9E9E9
| 555074 ||  || — || August 14, 2013 || Haleakala || Pan-STARRS ||  || align=right | 1.9 km || 
|-id=075 bgcolor=#E9E9E9
| 555075 ||  || — || August 8, 2013 || Haleakala || Pan-STARRS ||  || align=right | 1.3 km || 
|-id=076 bgcolor=#d6d6d6
| 555076 ||  || — || January 18, 2005 || Kitt Peak || Spacewatch ||  || align=right | 3.2 km || 
|-id=077 bgcolor=#E9E9E9
| 555077 ||  || — || August 8, 2013 || Palomar || PTF ||  || align=right | 1.3 km || 
|-id=078 bgcolor=#d6d6d6
| 555078 ||  || — || August 27, 2013 || Haleakala || Pan-STARRS ||  || align=right | 1.8 km || 
|-id=079 bgcolor=#E9E9E9
| 555079 ||  || — || July 5, 2000 || Anderson Mesa || LONEOS || JUN || align=right | 1.1 km || 
|-id=080 bgcolor=#E9E9E9
| 555080 ||  || — || February 25, 2011 || Mount Lemmon || Mount Lemmon Survey ||  || align=right | 1.6 km || 
|-id=081 bgcolor=#E9E9E9
| 555081 ||  || — || February 8, 2011 || Mount Lemmon || Mount Lemmon Survey ||  || align=right | 2.0 km || 
|-id=082 bgcolor=#E9E9E9
| 555082 ||  || — || August 12, 2004 || Cerro Tololo || Cerro Tololo Obs. ||  || align=right | 1.5 km || 
|-id=083 bgcolor=#d6d6d6
| 555083 ||  || — || August 24, 2008 || Kitt Peak || Spacewatch ||  || align=right | 1.9 km || 
|-id=084 bgcolor=#E9E9E9
| 555084 ||  || — || April 27, 2012 || Haleakala || Pan-STARRS ||  || align=right | 1.7 km || 
|-id=085 bgcolor=#d6d6d6
| 555085 ||  || — || August 30, 2013 || Haleakala || Pan-STARRS ||  || align=right | 1.6 km || 
|-id=086 bgcolor=#E9E9E9
| 555086 ||  || — || October 25, 2005 || Mount Lemmon || Mount Lemmon Survey ||  || align=right | 1.6 km || 
|-id=087 bgcolor=#d6d6d6
| 555087 ||  || — || August 15, 2013 || Haleakala || Pan-STARRS ||  || align=right | 1.7 km || 
|-id=088 bgcolor=#E9E9E9
| 555088 ||  || — || January 19, 2012 || Haleakala || Pan-STARRS ||  || align=right | 1.9 km || 
|-id=089 bgcolor=#E9E9E9
| 555089 ||  || — || May 27, 2008 || Mount Lemmon || Mount Lemmon Survey ||  || align=right | 1.1 km || 
|-id=090 bgcolor=#d6d6d6
| 555090 ||  || — || July 22, 2002 || Palomar || NEAT ||  || align=right | 4.3 km || 
|-id=091 bgcolor=#E9E9E9
| 555091 ||  || — || February 25, 2011 || Mount Lemmon || Mount Lemmon Survey ||  || align=right | 1.4 km || 
|-id=092 bgcolor=#E9E9E9
| 555092 Annasusanne ||  ||  || August 30, 2013 || SATINO Remote || J. Jahn ||  || align=right | 1.7 km || 
|-id=093 bgcolor=#E9E9E9
| 555093 ||  || — || August 31, 2013 || Haleakala || Pan-STARRS ||  || align=right | 1.5 km || 
|-id=094 bgcolor=#fefefe
| 555094 ||  || — || October 11, 2007 || Mount Lemmon || Mount Lemmon Survey ||  || align=right data-sort-value="0.41" | 410 m || 
|-id=095 bgcolor=#E9E9E9
| 555095 ||  || — || August 26, 2013 || Haleakala || Pan-STARRS ||  || align=right | 1.9 km || 
|-id=096 bgcolor=#E9E9E9
| 555096 ||  || — || August 26, 2013 || Haleakala || Pan-STARRS ||  || align=right | 1.7 km || 
|-id=097 bgcolor=#E9E9E9
| 555097 ||  || — || November 11, 2009 || Mount Lemmon || Mount Lemmon Survey ||  || align=right | 1.6 km || 
|-id=098 bgcolor=#E9E9E9
| 555098 ||  || — || September 27, 2009 || Mount Lemmon || Mount Lemmon Survey ||  || align=right | 1.9 km || 
|-id=099 bgcolor=#d6d6d6
| 555099 ||  || — || October 18, 2003 || Palomar || NEAT ||  || align=right | 2.1 km || 
|-id=100 bgcolor=#E9E9E9
| 555100 ||  || — || August 26, 2005 || Palomar || NEAT ||  || align=right | 1.4 km || 
|}

555101–555200 

|-bgcolor=#fefefe
| 555101 ||  || — || October 7, 2008 || Kitt Peak || Spacewatch || H || align=right data-sort-value="0.78" | 780 m || 
|-id=102 bgcolor=#E9E9E9
| 555102 ||  || — || August 26, 2013 || Haleakala || Pan-STARRS ||  || align=right | 1.8 km || 
|-id=103 bgcolor=#E9E9E9
| 555103 ||  || — || January 14, 2011 || Kitt Peak || Spacewatch ||  || align=right | 1.8 km || 
|-id=104 bgcolor=#E9E9E9
| 555104 ||  || — || February 5, 2011 || Mount Lemmon || Mount Lemmon Survey ||  || align=right | 1.9 km || 
|-id=105 bgcolor=#E9E9E9
| 555105 ||  || — || February 13, 2011 || Mount Lemmon || Mount Lemmon Survey ||  || align=right | 1.7 km || 
|-id=106 bgcolor=#E9E9E9
| 555106 ||  || — || January 14, 2011 || Kitt Peak || Spacewatch ||  || align=right | 1.7 km || 
|-id=107 bgcolor=#E9E9E9
| 555107 ||  || — || August 9, 2013 || Kitt Peak || Spacewatch ||  || align=right | 1.7 km || 
|-id=108 bgcolor=#E9E9E9
| 555108 ||  || — || July 14, 2013 || Haleakala || Pan-STARRS ||  || align=right data-sort-value="0.86" | 860 m || 
|-id=109 bgcolor=#E9E9E9
| 555109 ||  || — || February 10, 2011 || Kitt Peak || Mount Lemmon Survey ||  || align=right | 1.7 km || 
|-id=110 bgcolor=#E9E9E9
| 555110 ||  || — || March 14, 2007 || Mount Lemmon || Mount Lemmon Survey ||  || align=right | 2.2 km || 
|-id=111 bgcolor=#d6d6d6
| 555111 ||  || — || October 11, 2004 || Kitt Peak || L. H. Wasserman, J. R. Lovering ||  || align=right | 2.0 km || 
|-id=112 bgcolor=#E9E9E9
| 555112 Monika ||  ||  || August 30, 2013 || Tincana || M. Żołnowski, M. Kusiak ||  || align=right | 1.2 km || 
|-id=113 bgcolor=#E9E9E9
| 555113 ||  || — || August 27, 2013 || Haleakala || Pan-STARRS ||  || align=right | 1.7 km || 
|-id=114 bgcolor=#E9E9E9
| 555114 ||  || — || November 7, 2005 || Mauna Kea || Mauna Kea Obs. ||  || align=right | 1.8 km || 
|-id=115 bgcolor=#E9E9E9
| 555115 ||  || — || August 14, 2013 || Haleakala || Pan-STARRS ||  || align=right | 2.2 km || 
|-id=116 bgcolor=#d6d6d6
| 555116 ||  || — || February 5, 2011 || Haleakala || Pan-STARRS ||  || align=right | 1.9 km || 
|-id=117 bgcolor=#E9E9E9
| 555117 ||  || — || April 27, 2012 || Kitt Peak || Pan-STARRS ||  || align=right | 1.4 km || 
|-id=118 bgcolor=#E9E9E9
| 555118 ||  || — || February 21, 2012 || Mount Lemmon || Mount Lemmon Survey ||  || align=right | 1.7 km || 
|-id=119 bgcolor=#E9E9E9
| 555119 ||  || — || October 23, 2009 || Mount Lemmon || Mount Lemmon Survey ||  || align=right | 1.4 km || 
|-id=120 bgcolor=#E9E9E9
| 555120 ||  || — || September 1, 2013 || SATINO Remote || J. Jahn ||  || align=right | 1.4 km || 
|-id=121 bgcolor=#E9E9E9
| 555121 ||  || — || March 14, 2011 || Mount Lemmon || Mount Lemmon Survey || AGN || align=right data-sort-value="0.90" | 900 m || 
|-id=122 bgcolor=#FFC2E0
| 555122 ||  || — || September 5, 2013 || Mount Lemmon || Mount Lemmon Survey || APO +1km || align=right | 1.4 km || 
|-id=123 bgcolor=#d6d6d6
| 555123 ||  || — || September 22, 2008 || Kitt Peak || Spacewatch ||  || align=right | 2.3 km || 
|-id=124 bgcolor=#E9E9E9
| 555124 ||  || — || August 17, 2013 || Haleakala || Pan-STARRS ||  || align=right | 1.9 km || 
|-id=125 bgcolor=#d6d6d6
| 555125 ||  || — || September 10, 2013 || Haleakala || Pan-STARRS ||  || align=right | 2.2 km || 
|-id=126 bgcolor=#E9E9E9
| 555126 ||  || — || September 23, 2004 || Vail-Jarnac || Jarnac Obs. || GEF || align=right | 1.1 km || 
|-id=127 bgcolor=#E9E9E9
| 555127 ||  || — || September 11, 2013 || Palomar || PTF ||  || align=right | 2.1 km || 
|-id=128 bgcolor=#E9E9E9
| 555128 Birštonas ||  ||  || September 12, 2013 || Baldone || K. Černis, I. Eglītis ||  || align=right | 2.0 km || 
|-id=129 bgcolor=#d6d6d6
| 555129 ||  || — || September 20, 2003 || Kitt Peak || Spacewatch ||  || align=right | 2.1 km || 
|-id=130 bgcolor=#d6d6d6
| 555130 ||  || — || September 10, 2013 || Haleakala || Pan-STARRS ||  || align=right | 2.0 km || 
|-id=131 bgcolor=#E9E9E9
| 555131 ||  || — || September 7, 2004 || Palomar || NEAT ||  || align=right | 3.3 km || 
|-id=132 bgcolor=#E9E9E9
| 555132 ||  || — || March 16, 2012 || Haleakala || Pan-STARRS ||  || align=right data-sort-value="0.97" | 970 m || 
|-id=133 bgcolor=#E9E9E9
| 555133 ||  || — || March 1, 2011 || Mount Lemmon || Mount Lemmon Survey ||  || align=right | 1.7 km || 
|-id=134 bgcolor=#d6d6d6
| 555134 ||  || — || September 6, 2008 || Mount Lemmon || Mount Lemmon Survey || KOR || align=right | 1.2 km || 
|-id=135 bgcolor=#E9E9E9
| 555135 ||  || — || August 14, 2013 || Haleakala || Pan-STARRS ||  || align=right | 1.8 km || 
|-id=136 bgcolor=#E9E9E9
| 555136 ||  || — || September 12, 2004 || Kitt Peak || Spacewatch ||  || align=right | 1.7 km || 
|-id=137 bgcolor=#E9E9E9
| 555137 ||  || — || November 19, 2009 || Mount Lemmon || Mount Lemmon Survey ||  || align=right | 1.5 km || 
|-id=138 bgcolor=#E9E9E9
| 555138 ||  || — || October 7, 2005 || Mauna Kea || Mauna Kea Obs. ||  || align=right | 3.1 km || 
|-id=139 bgcolor=#E9E9E9
| 555139 ||  || — || February 26, 2012 || Kitt Peak || Spacewatch ||  || align=right | 1.2 km || 
|-id=140 bgcolor=#d6d6d6
| 555140 ||  || — || September 13, 2013 || Palomar || PTF ||  || align=right | 3.1 km || 
|-id=141 bgcolor=#E9E9E9
| 555141 ||  || — || September 20, 2000 || Haleakala || AMOS ||  || align=right | 2.1 km || 
|-id=142 bgcolor=#d6d6d6
| 555142 ||  || — || September 6, 2008 || Mount Lemmon || Mount Lemmon Survey || KOR || align=right | 1.3 km || 
|-id=143 bgcolor=#E9E9E9
| 555143 ||  || — || May 9, 2007 || Mount Lemmon || Mount Lemmon Survey ||  || align=right | 1.7 km || 
|-id=144 bgcolor=#E9E9E9
| 555144 ||  || — || March 6, 2011 || Mount Lemmon || Mount Lemmon Survey ||  || align=right | 2.3 km || 
|-id=145 bgcolor=#E9E9E9
| 555145 ||  || — || November 17, 2009 || Kitt Peak || Spacewatch ||  || align=right | 2.2 km || 
|-id=146 bgcolor=#d6d6d6
| 555146 ||  || — || September 13, 2013 || Kitt Peak || Spacewatch ||  || align=right | 2.5 km || 
|-id=147 bgcolor=#E9E9E9
| 555147 ||  || — || October 5, 2004 || Kitt Peak || Spacewatch ||  || align=right | 2.0 km || 
|-id=148 bgcolor=#E9E9E9
| 555148 ||  || — || September 14, 2013 || Kitt Peak || Spacewatch ||  || align=right | 1.7 km || 
|-id=149 bgcolor=#d6d6d6
| 555149 ||  || — || September 1, 2013 || Mount Lemmon || Mount Lemmon Survey ||  || align=right | 2.5 km || 
|-id=150 bgcolor=#E9E9E9
| 555150 ||  || — || September 5, 2013 || Kitt Peak || Spacewatch ||  || align=right | 1.8 km || 
|-id=151 bgcolor=#E9E9E9
| 555151 ||  || — || March 28, 2008 || Mount Lemmon || Mount Lemmon Survey ||  || align=right | 1.2 km || 
|-id=152 bgcolor=#E9E9E9
| 555152 Oproiu ||  ||  || November 14, 2009 || La Palma || EURONEAR ||  || align=right | 1.9 km || 
|-id=153 bgcolor=#d6d6d6
| 555153 ||  || — || September 15, 2013 || Mount Lemmon || Mount Lemmon Survey ||  || align=right | 1.8 km || 
|-id=154 bgcolor=#E9E9E9
| 555154 ||  || — || September 14, 2013 || Haleakala || Pan-STARRS ||  || align=right | 1.5 km || 
|-id=155 bgcolor=#d6d6d6
| 555155 ||  || — || September 2, 2013 || Mount Lemmon || Mount Lemmon Survey ||  || align=right | 2.1 km || 
|-id=156 bgcolor=#d6d6d6
| 555156 ||  || — || September 16, 2003 || Kitt Peak || Spacewatch ||  || align=right | 1.7 km || 
|-id=157 bgcolor=#d6d6d6
| 555157 ||  || — || March 13, 2011 || Mount Lemmon || Mount Lemmon Survey ||  || align=right | 3.1 km || 
|-id=158 bgcolor=#d6d6d6
| 555158 ||  || — || September 6, 2013 || Kitt Peak || Spacewatch ||  || align=right | 2.5 km || 
|-id=159 bgcolor=#C2FFFF
| 555159 ||  || — || September 3, 2013 || Mount Lemmon || Mount Lemmon Survey || L5 || align=right | 6.7 km || 
|-id=160 bgcolor=#E9E9E9
| 555160 ||  || — || September 4, 2013 || Catalina || CSS ||  || align=right | 2.5 km || 
|-id=161 bgcolor=#d6d6d6
| 555161 ||  || — || September 6, 2013 || Kitt Peak || Spacewatch ||  || align=right | 2.8 km || 
|-id=162 bgcolor=#d6d6d6
| 555162 ||  || — || January 17, 2015 || Mount Lemmon || Mount Lemmon Survey ||  || align=right | 1.9 km || 
|-id=163 bgcolor=#E9E9E9
| 555163 ||  || — || September 1, 2013 || Haleakala || Pan-STARRS ||  || align=right | 1.6 km || 
|-id=164 bgcolor=#d6d6d6
| 555164 ||  || — || September 9, 2013 || Haleakala || Pan-STARRS ||  || align=right | 1.9 km || 
|-id=165 bgcolor=#d6d6d6
| 555165 ||  || — || March 30, 2016 || Haleakala || Pan-STARRS ||  || align=right | 2.3 km || 
|-id=166 bgcolor=#E9E9E9
| 555166 ||  || — || September 2, 2013 || Mount Lemmon || Mount Lemmon Survey ||  || align=right | 1.5 km || 
|-id=167 bgcolor=#E9E9E9
| 555167 ||  || — || September 1, 2013 || Haleakala || Pan-STARRS ||  || align=right | 1.7 km || 
|-id=168 bgcolor=#C2FFFF
| 555168 ||  || — || September 14, 2013 || Haleakala || Pan-STARRS || L5 || align=right | 7.2 km || 
|-id=169 bgcolor=#E9E9E9
| 555169 ||  || — || June 1, 2008 || Mount Lemmon || Mount Lemmon Survey ||  || align=right | 1.7 km || 
|-id=170 bgcolor=#d6d6d6
| 555170 ||  || — || September 14, 2013 || Haleakala || Pan-STARRS ||  || align=right | 2.0 km || 
|-id=171 bgcolor=#d6d6d6
| 555171 ||  || — || September 14, 2013 || Haleakala || Pan-STARRS ||  || align=right | 2.3 km || 
|-id=172 bgcolor=#E9E9E9
| 555172 ||  || — || August 31, 2017 || Mount Lemmon || Mount Lemmon Survey ||  || align=right | 2.7 km || 
|-id=173 bgcolor=#C2FFFF
| 555173 ||  || — || March 31, 2008 || Kitt Peak || Spacewatch || L5 || align=right | 10 km || 
|-id=174 bgcolor=#d6d6d6
| 555174 ||  || — || September 17, 2013 || Mount Lemmon || Mount Lemmon Survey ||  || align=right | 2.6 km || 
|-id=175 bgcolor=#d6d6d6
| 555175 ||  || — || September 17, 2013 || Mount Lemmon || Mount Lemmon Survey ||  || align=right | 2.1 km || 
|-id=176 bgcolor=#E9E9E9
| 555176 ||  || — || August 14, 2013 || Haleakala || Pan-STARRS ||  || align=right | 2.3 km || 
|-id=177 bgcolor=#d6d6d6
| 555177 ||  || — || November 17, 2009 || Kitt Peak || Spacewatch ||  || align=right | 1.7 km || 
|-id=178 bgcolor=#fefefe
| 555178 ||  || — || September 7, 2002 || Campo Imperatore || CINEOS || H || align=right data-sort-value="0.57" | 570 m || 
|-id=179 bgcolor=#E9E9E9
| 555179 ||  || — || September 23, 2013 || Mount Lemmon || Mount Lemmon Survey ||  || align=right | 1.6 km || 
|-id=180 bgcolor=#E9E9E9
| 555180 ||  || — || September 11, 2004 || Kitt Peak || Spacewatch ||  || align=right | 1.6 km || 
|-id=181 bgcolor=#E9E9E9
| 555181 ||  || — || March 2, 2011 || Mount Lemmon || Mount Lemmon Survey ||  || align=right | 1.7 km || 
|-id=182 bgcolor=#E9E9E9
| 555182 ||  || — || September 28, 2013 || Oukaimeden || C. Rinner ||  || align=right | 1.8 km || 
|-id=183 bgcolor=#d6d6d6
| 555183 ||  || — || December 2, 2005 || Kitt Peak || L. H. Wasserman, R. Millis ||  || align=right | 2.7 km || 
|-id=184 bgcolor=#E9E9E9
| 555184 ||  || — || October 23, 2004 || Kitt Peak || Spacewatch || AGN || align=right | 1.1 km || 
|-id=185 bgcolor=#d6d6d6
| 555185 ||  || — || September 9, 2013 || Haleakala || Pan-STARRS ||  || align=right | 2.0 km || 
|-id=186 bgcolor=#d6d6d6
| 555186 ||  || — || August 4, 2003 || Kitt Peak || Spacewatch ||  || align=right | 2.7 km || 
|-id=187 bgcolor=#E9E9E9
| 555187 ||  || — || January 26, 2006 || Mount Lemmon || Mount Lemmon Survey ||  || align=right | 2.1 km || 
|-id=188 bgcolor=#d6d6d6
| 555188 ||  || — || September 26, 2013 || Catalina || CSS ||  || align=right | 2.6 km || 
|-id=189 bgcolor=#E9E9E9
| 555189 ||  || — || November 20, 2009 || Mount Lemmon || Mount Lemmon Survey ||  || align=right | 1.9 km || 
|-id=190 bgcolor=#d6d6d6
| 555190 ||  || — || September 1, 2013 || Mount Lemmon || Mount Lemmon Survey ||  || align=right | 1.9 km || 
|-id=191 bgcolor=#E9E9E9
| 555191 ||  || — || September 28, 2013 || Mount Lemmon || Mount Lemmon Survey ||  || align=right | 2.3 km || 
|-id=192 bgcolor=#E9E9E9
| 555192 ||  || — || October 15, 2004 || Mount Lemmon || Mount Lemmon Survey ||  || align=right | 2.1 km || 
|-id=193 bgcolor=#E9E9E9
| 555193 ||  || — || February 7, 2002 || Kitt Peak || R. Millis, M. W. Buie ||  || align=right | 2.9 km || 
|-id=194 bgcolor=#d6d6d6
| 555194 ||  || — || September 20, 2008 || Mount Lemmon || Mount Lemmon Survey ||  || align=right | 1.8 km || 
|-id=195 bgcolor=#E9E9E9
| 555195 ||  || — || January 7, 2006 || Kitt Peak || Spacewatch ||  || align=right | 1.9 km || 
|-id=196 bgcolor=#d6d6d6
| 555196 ||  || — || September 25, 2013 || Mount Lemmon || Mount Lemmon Survey ||  || align=right | 1.7 km || 
|-id=197 bgcolor=#E9E9E9
| 555197 ||  || — || October 24, 2005 || Mauna Kea || Mauna Kea Obs. || AGN || align=right | 1.4 km || 
|-id=198 bgcolor=#E9E9E9
| 555198 ||  || — || September 29, 2001 || Palomar || NEAT ||  || align=right | 1.0 km || 
|-id=199 bgcolor=#E9E9E9
| 555199 ||  || — || March 23, 2012 || Kitt Peak || Spacewatch ||  || align=right | 2.2 km || 
|-id=200 bgcolor=#E9E9E9
| 555200 ||  || — || September 9, 2013 || Haleakala || Pan-STARRS ||  || align=right | 2.2 km || 
|}

555201–555300 

|-bgcolor=#E9E9E9
| 555201 ||  || — || September 6, 2013 || Kitt Peak || Spacewatch ||  || align=right | 1.6 km || 
|-id=202 bgcolor=#d6d6d6
| 555202 ||  || — || September 29, 2013 || Mount Lemmon || Mount Lemmon Survey ||  || align=right | 1.7 km || 
|-id=203 bgcolor=#d6d6d6
| 555203 ||  || — || July 20, 2013 || Haleakala || Pan-STARRS || EUP || align=right | 2.7 km || 
|-id=204 bgcolor=#d6d6d6
| 555204 ||  || — || October 3, 2002 || Palomar || NEAT ||  || align=right | 2.9 km || 
|-id=205 bgcolor=#E9E9E9
| 555205 ||  || — || February 8, 2011 || Mount Lemmon || Mount Lemmon Survey ||  || align=right | 2.0 km || 
|-id=206 bgcolor=#d6d6d6
| 555206 ||  || — || March 19, 2004 || Socorro || LINEAR ||  || align=right | 2.3 km || 
|-id=207 bgcolor=#E9E9E9
| 555207 ||  || — || May 14, 2012 || Haleakala || Pan-STARRS ||  || align=right | 1.9 km || 
|-id=208 bgcolor=#d6d6d6
| 555208 ||  || — || September 25, 2013 || Mount Lemmon || Mount Lemmon Survey ||  || align=right | 2.3 km || 
|-id=209 bgcolor=#d6d6d6
| 555209 ||  || — || October 1, 2013 || Kitt Peak || Spacewatch ||  || align=right | 2.7 km || 
|-id=210 bgcolor=#d6d6d6
| 555210 ||  || — || October 23, 2003 || Kitt Peak || SDSS ||  || align=right | 2.4 km || 
|-id=211 bgcolor=#d6d6d6
| 555211 ||  || — || December 2, 2008 || Kitt Peak || Spacewatch ||  || align=right | 2.0 km || 
|-id=212 bgcolor=#d6d6d6
| 555212 ||  || — || September 10, 2007 || Mount Lemmon || Mount Lemmon Survey ||  || align=right | 2.7 km || 
|-id=213 bgcolor=#d6d6d6
| 555213 ||  || — || September 6, 2008 || Kitt Peak || Spacewatch ||  || align=right | 1.7 km || 
|-id=214 bgcolor=#fefefe
| 555214 ||  || — || November 2, 1999 || Kitt Peak || Spacewatch ||  || align=right data-sort-value="0.40" | 400 m || 
|-id=215 bgcolor=#d6d6d6
| 555215 ||  || — || October 3, 2013 || Mount Lemmon || Mount Lemmon Survey ||  || align=right | 2.5 km || 
|-id=216 bgcolor=#d6d6d6
| 555216 ||  || — || October 17, 2003 || Apache Point || SDSS Collaboration ||  || align=right | 2.9 km || 
|-id=217 bgcolor=#d6d6d6
| 555217 ||  || — || November 8, 2008 || Mount Lemmon || Mount Lemmon Survey ||  || align=right | 2.2 km || 
|-id=218 bgcolor=#d6d6d6
| 555218 ||  || — || September 3, 2008 || Kitt Peak || Spacewatch ||  || align=right | 1.9 km || 
|-id=219 bgcolor=#E9E9E9
| 555219 ||  || — || October 4, 2013 || Mount Lemmon || Mount Lemmon Survey ||  || align=right | 2.1 km || 
|-id=220 bgcolor=#E9E9E9
| 555220 ||  || — || July 29, 2008 || Kitt Peak || Spacewatch ||  || align=right | 1.8 km || 
|-id=221 bgcolor=#d6d6d6
| 555221 ||  || — || November 6, 2008 || Mount Lemmon || Mount Lemmon Survey ||  || align=right | 2.2 km || 
|-id=222 bgcolor=#E9E9E9
| 555222 ||  || — || September 14, 2013 || Kitt Peak || Spacewatch ||  || align=right | 1.5 km || 
|-id=223 bgcolor=#E9E9E9
| 555223 ||  || — || March 1, 2011 || Mount Lemmon || Mount Lemmon Survey ||  || align=right | 1.7 km || 
|-id=224 bgcolor=#E9E9E9
| 555224 ||  || — || October 1, 2013 || Mount Lemmon || Mount Lemmon Survey ||  || align=right | 1.6 km || 
|-id=225 bgcolor=#d6d6d6
| 555225 ||  || — || October 3, 2008 || Kitt Peak || Spacewatch ||  || align=right | 1.9 km || 
|-id=226 bgcolor=#d6d6d6
| 555226 ||  || — || October 1, 2013 || Kitt Peak || Spacewatch ||  || align=right | 2.5 km || 
|-id=227 bgcolor=#d6d6d6
| 555227 Claraisabella ||  ||  || September 4, 2013 || Calar Alto || F. Hormuth ||  || align=right | 1.8 km || 
|-id=228 bgcolor=#d6d6d6
| 555228 ||  || — || October 8, 2007 || Mount Lemmon || Mount Lemmon Survey || 7:4 || align=right | 2.3 km || 
|-id=229 bgcolor=#E9E9E9
| 555229 ||  || — || October 1, 2013 || Kitt Peak || Spacewatch ||  || align=right | 1.8 km || 
|-id=230 bgcolor=#d6d6d6
| 555230 ||  || — || October 2, 2013 || Kitt Peak || Spacewatch ||  || align=right | 2.1 km || 
|-id=231 bgcolor=#d6d6d6
| 555231 ||  || — || August 3, 2013 || Haleakala || Pan-STARRS ||  || align=right | 2.1 km || 
|-id=232 bgcolor=#d6d6d6
| 555232 ||  || — || October 2, 2013 || Mount Lemmon || Mount Lemmon Survey ||  || align=right | 2.1 km || 
|-id=233 bgcolor=#d6d6d6
| 555233 ||  || — || September 30, 2013 || Mount Lemmon || Mount Lemmon Survey ||  || align=right | 2.4 km || 
|-id=234 bgcolor=#E9E9E9
| 555234 ||  || — || September 7, 2008 || Mount Lemmon || Mount Lemmon Survey ||  || align=right | 1.6 km || 
|-id=235 bgcolor=#E9E9E9
| 555235 ||  || — || November 3, 2004 || Palomar || NEAT ||  || align=right | 2.6 km || 
|-id=236 bgcolor=#d6d6d6
| 555236 ||  || — || October 4, 2013 || Mount Lemmon || Mount Lemmon Survey ||  || align=right | 2.1 km || 
|-id=237 bgcolor=#d6d6d6
| 555237 ||  || — || September 11, 2007 || Mount Lemmon || Mount Lemmon Survey || THB || align=right | 2.7 km || 
|-id=238 bgcolor=#E9E9E9
| 555238 ||  || — || April 28, 2003 || Kitt Peak || Spacewatch ||  || align=right | 2.3 km || 
|-id=239 bgcolor=#E9E9E9
| 555239 ||  || — || November 12, 2005 || Kitt Peak || Spacewatch ||  || align=right | 2.7 km || 
|-id=240 bgcolor=#E9E9E9
| 555240 ||  || — || October 9, 2004 || Kitt Peak || Spacewatch ||  || align=right | 1.9 km || 
|-id=241 bgcolor=#d6d6d6
| 555241 ||  || — || October 5, 2013 || Haleakala || Pan-STARRS ||  || align=right | 2.2 km || 
|-id=242 bgcolor=#E9E9E9
| 555242 ||  || — || October 5, 2013 || Mount Lemmon || Mount Lemmon Survey ||  || align=right | 1.9 km || 
|-id=243 bgcolor=#d6d6d6
| 555243 ||  || — || September 14, 2002 || Kitt Peak || AMOS ||  || align=right | 2.1 km || 
|-id=244 bgcolor=#E9E9E9
| 555244 ||  || — || August 25, 2008 || Hibiscus || N. Teamo, S. F. Hönig || DOR || align=right | 2.7 km || 
|-id=245 bgcolor=#E9E9E9
| 555245 ||  || — || October 12, 2013 || Oukaimeden || C. Rinner ||  || align=right | 1.6 km || 
|-id=246 bgcolor=#d6d6d6
| 555246 ||  || — || October 17, 2003 || Kitt Peak || SDSS ||  || align=right | 2.7 km || 
|-id=247 bgcolor=#d6d6d6
| 555247 ||  || — || September 15, 2013 || Mount Lemmon || Mount Lemmon Survey || EOS || align=right | 1.3 km || 
|-id=248 bgcolor=#d6d6d6
| 555248 ||  || — || October 1, 2013 || Mount Lemmon || Mount Lemmon Survey ||  || align=right | 1.8 km || 
|-id=249 bgcolor=#E9E9E9
| 555249 ||  || — || September 15, 2013 || Haleakala || Pan-STARRS ||  || align=right | 1.7 km || 
|-id=250 bgcolor=#E9E9E9
| 555250 ||  || — || February 7, 2011 || Mount Lemmon || Mount Lemmon Survey ||  || align=right | 1.5 km || 
|-id=251 bgcolor=#d6d6d6
| 555251 ||  || — || November 11, 2013 || Kitt Peak || Spacewatch ||  || align=right | 1.5 km || 
|-id=252 bgcolor=#E9E9E9
| 555252 ||  || — || April 1, 2003 || Kitt Peak || M. W. Buie, A. B. Jordan ||  || align=right | 1.7 km || 
|-id=253 bgcolor=#E9E9E9
| 555253 ||  || — || October 3, 2013 || Haleakala || Pan-STARRS ||  || align=right | 1.8 km || 
|-id=254 bgcolor=#d6d6d6
| 555254 ||  || — || October 2, 2013 || Mount Lemmon || Mount Lemmon Survey ||  || align=right | 2.6 km || 
|-id=255 bgcolor=#d6d6d6
| 555255 ||  || — || October 5, 2013 || Haleakala || Pan-STARRS ||  || align=right | 2.7 km || 
|-id=256 bgcolor=#d6d6d6
| 555256 ||  || — || October 15, 2013 || Oukaimeden || M. Ory ||  || align=right | 2.4 km || 
|-id=257 bgcolor=#E9E9E9
| 555257 ||  || — || October 12, 2013 || Catalina || CSS ||  || align=right | 1.5 km || 
|-id=258 bgcolor=#d6d6d6
| 555258 ||  || — || October 2, 2013 || Kitt Peak || Spacewatch ||  || align=right | 2.1 km || 
|-id=259 bgcolor=#d6d6d6
| 555259 ||  || — || October 14, 2013 || Kitt Peak || Spacewatch ||  || align=right | 2.5 km || 
|-id=260 bgcolor=#d6d6d6
| 555260 ||  || — || October 4, 2013 || Kitt Peak || Spacewatch ||  || align=right | 2.5 km || 
|-id=261 bgcolor=#E9E9E9
| 555261 ||  || — || October 3, 2013 || Kitt Peak || Spacewatch ||  || align=right | 2.3 km || 
|-id=262 bgcolor=#d6d6d6
| 555262 ||  || — || October 4, 2013 || Mount Lemmon || Mount Lemmon Survey ||  || align=right | 2.3 km || 
|-id=263 bgcolor=#E9E9E9
| 555263 ||  || — || October 9, 2013 || Mount Lemmon || Mount Lemmon Survey ||  || align=right | 1.6 km || 
|-id=264 bgcolor=#d6d6d6
| 555264 ||  || — || October 6, 2013 || Kitt Peak || Spacewatch ||  || align=right | 2.0 km || 
|-id=265 bgcolor=#d6d6d6
| 555265 ||  || — || October 3, 2013 || Mount Lemmon || Mount Lemmon Survey ||  || align=right | 2.1 km || 
|-id=266 bgcolor=#d6d6d6
| 555266 ||  || — || October 12, 2013 || Kitt Peak || Spacewatch ||  || align=right | 2.1 km || 
|-id=267 bgcolor=#d6d6d6
| 555267 ||  || — || October 6, 2013 || Kitt Peak || Spacewatch ||  || align=right | 2.2 km || 
|-id=268 bgcolor=#d6d6d6
| 555268 ||  || — || October 9, 2013 || Mount Lemmon || Mount Lemmon Survey ||  || align=right | 2.1 km || 
|-id=269 bgcolor=#d6d6d6
| 555269 ||  || — || March 28, 2011 || Mount Lemmon || Mount Lemmon Survey ||  || align=right | 1.7 km || 
|-id=270 bgcolor=#d6d6d6
| 555270 ||  || — || October 3, 2013 || Kitt Peak || Spacewatch ||  || align=right | 2.1 km || 
|-id=271 bgcolor=#d6d6d6
| 555271 ||  || — || October 12, 2013 || Kitt Peak || Spacewatch ||  || align=right | 2.0 km || 
|-id=272 bgcolor=#C2FFFF
| 555272 ||  || — || October 3, 2013 || Mount Lemmon || Mount Lemmon Survey || L5 || align=right | 6.9 km || 
|-id=273 bgcolor=#E9E9E9
| 555273 ||  || — || October 3, 2013 || Haleakala || Pan-STARRS ||  || align=right | 1.5 km || 
|-id=274 bgcolor=#d6d6d6
| 555274 ||  || — || October 3, 2013 || Kitt Peak || Spacewatch ||  || align=right | 2.5 km || 
|-id=275 bgcolor=#d6d6d6
| 555275 ||  || — || October 5, 2013 || Haleakala || Pan-STARRS ||  || align=right | 1.5 km || 
|-id=276 bgcolor=#C2FFFF
| 555276 ||  || — || October 9, 2013 || Mount Lemmon || Mount Lemmon Survey || L5 || align=right | 6.4 km || 
|-id=277 bgcolor=#fefefe
| 555277 ||  || — || October 12, 2013 || Kitt Peak || Spacewatch ||  || align=right data-sort-value="0.61" | 610 m || 
|-id=278 bgcolor=#fefefe
| 555278 ||  || — || December 10, 2005 || Kitt Peak || Spacewatch || H || align=right data-sort-value="0.76" | 760 m || 
|-id=279 bgcolor=#E9E9E9
| 555279 ||  || — || November 4, 2004 || Kitt Peak || Spacewatch ||  || align=right | 1.9 km || 
|-id=280 bgcolor=#d6d6d6
| 555280 ||  || — || October 5, 2013 || Haleakala || Pan-STARRS ||  || align=right | 2.5 km || 
|-id=281 bgcolor=#d6d6d6
| 555281 ||  || — || September 24, 2008 || Mount Lemmon || Mount Lemmon Survey ||  || align=right | 1.9 km || 
|-id=282 bgcolor=#E9E9E9
| 555282 ||  || — || May 27, 2012 || Mount Lemmon || Mount Lemmon Survey ||  || align=right | 1.3 km || 
|-id=283 bgcolor=#E9E9E9
| 555283 ||  || — || December 3, 2005 || Mauna Kea || Mauna Kea Obs. ||  || align=right | 1.7 km || 
|-id=284 bgcolor=#d6d6d6
| 555284 ||  || — || October 25, 2013 || Kitt Peak || Spacewatch ||  || align=right | 2.0 km || 
|-id=285 bgcolor=#d6d6d6
| 555285 ||  || — || October 28, 2013 || Mount Lemmon || Mount Lemmon Survey ||  || align=right | 2.5 km || 
|-id=286 bgcolor=#d6d6d6
| 555286 ||  || — || October 26, 2013 || Kitt Peak || Spacewatch ||  || align=right | 2.5 km || 
|-id=287 bgcolor=#d6d6d6
| 555287 ||  || — || October 25, 2013 || Catalina || CSS ||  || align=right | 2.3 km || 
|-id=288 bgcolor=#d6d6d6
| 555288 ||  || — || April 13, 2010 || WISE || WISE ||  || align=right | 2.2 km || 
|-id=289 bgcolor=#d6d6d6
| 555289 ||  || — || October 31, 2013 || Kitt Peak || Spacewatch ||  || align=right | 2.1 km || 
|-id=290 bgcolor=#d6d6d6
| 555290 ||  || — || January 17, 2015 || Mount Lemmon || Mount Lemmon Survey ||  || align=right | 2.0 km || 
|-id=291 bgcolor=#d6d6d6
| 555291 ||  || — || October 30, 2013 || Haleakala || Pan-STARRS ||  || align=right | 2.1 km || 
|-id=292 bgcolor=#d6d6d6
| 555292 Bakels ||  ||  || October 31, 2013 || Piszkesteto || M. Langbroek, K. Sárneczky ||  || align=right | 3.1 km || 
|-id=293 bgcolor=#d6d6d6
| 555293 ||  || — || October 23, 2013 || Mount Lemmon || Mount Lemmon Survey ||  || align=right | 1.8 km || 
|-id=294 bgcolor=#d6d6d6
| 555294 ||  || — || October 31, 2013 || Mount Lemmon || Mount Lemmon Survey ||  || align=right | 2.4 km || 
|-id=295 bgcolor=#E9E9E9
| 555295 ||  || — || October 23, 2013 || Mount Lemmon || Mount Lemmon Survey ||  || align=right | 1.6 km || 
|-id=296 bgcolor=#d6d6d6
| 555296 ||  || — || October 31, 2013 || Kitt Peak || Spacewatch ||  || align=right | 2.0 km || 
|-id=297 bgcolor=#d6d6d6
| 555297 ||  || — || October 23, 2013 || Mount Lemmon || Mount Lemmon Survey ||  || align=right | 1.9 km || 
|-id=298 bgcolor=#d6d6d6
| 555298 ||  || — || October 23, 2013 || Mount Lemmon || Mount Lemmon Survey ||  || align=right | 1.6 km || 
|-id=299 bgcolor=#fefefe
| 555299 ||  || — || October 25, 2013 || Mount Lemmon || Mount Lemmon Survey ||  || align=right data-sort-value="0.72" | 720 m || 
|-id=300 bgcolor=#fefefe
| 555300 ||  || — || September 26, 2013 || Mount Lemmon || Mount Lemmon Survey ||  || align=right data-sort-value="0.58" | 580 m || 
|}

555301–555400 

|-bgcolor=#fefefe
| 555301 ||  || — || October 26, 2013 || Mount Lemmon || Mount Lemmon Survey ||  || align=right data-sort-value="0.47" | 470 m || 
|-id=302 bgcolor=#E9E9E9
| 555302 ||  || — || March 14, 2007 || Mount Lemmon || Mount Lemmon Survey ||  || align=right | 1.8 km || 
|-id=303 bgcolor=#d6d6d6
| 555303 ||  || — || January 16, 2009 || San Marcello || Pistoia Mountains Obs. ||  || align=right | 2.7 km || 
|-id=304 bgcolor=#d6d6d6
| 555304 ||  || — || October 24, 2013 || Mount Lemmon || Mount Lemmon Survey ||  || align=right | 2.2 km || 
|-id=305 bgcolor=#E9E9E9
| 555305 ||  || — || October 12, 2013 || Mount Lemmon || Mount Lemmon Survey ||  || align=right | 2.2 km || 
|-id=306 bgcolor=#d6d6d6
| 555306 ||  || — || December 20, 2008 || Mount Lemmon || Mount Lemmon Survey ||  || align=right | 2.2 km || 
|-id=307 bgcolor=#d6d6d6
| 555307 ||  || — || October 30, 2013 || Kitt Peak || Pan-STARRS ||  || align=right | 2.4 km || 
|-id=308 bgcolor=#d6d6d6
| 555308 ||  || — || January 25, 2003 || Palomar || NEAT || Tj (2.96) || align=right | 3.1 km || 
|-id=309 bgcolor=#d6d6d6
| 555309 ||  || — || November 23, 2002 || Palomar || NEAT || TIR || align=right | 3.0 km || 
|-id=310 bgcolor=#E9E9E9
| 555310 ||  || — || October 27, 2013 || Catalina || CSS ||  || align=right | 2.4 km || 
|-id=311 bgcolor=#d6d6d6
| 555311 ||  || — || July 19, 2001 || Palomar || NEAT ||  || align=right | 3.2 km || 
|-id=312 bgcolor=#d6d6d6
| 555312 ||  || — || November 1, 2013 || Palomar || PTF ||  || align=right | 3.2 km || 
|-id=313 bgcolor=#d6d6d6
| 555313 ||  || — || July 16, 2013 || Haleakala || Pan-STARRS || TIR || align=right | 2.5 km || 
|-id=314 bgcolor=#d6d6d6
| 555314 ||  || — || October 26, 2013 || Catalina || CSS ||  || align=right | 2.6 km || 
|-id=315 bgcolor=#d6d6d6
| 555315 ||  || — || November 19, 2008 || Kitt Peak || Spacewatch ||  || align=right | 1.7 km || 
|-id=316 bgcolor=#d6d6d6
| 555316 ||  || — || November 2, 2013 || Kitt Peak || Spacewatch ||  || align=right | 1.8 km || 
|-id=317 bgcolor=#d6d6d6
| 555317 ||  || — || November 2, 2013 || Mount Lemmon || Mount Lemmon Survey ||  || align=right | 2.4 km || 
|-id=318 bgcolor=#d6d6d6
| 555318 ||  || — || November 8, 2013 || Kitt Peak || Spacewatch ||  || align=right | 1.8 km || 
|-id=319 bgcolor=#d6d6d6
| 555319 ||  || — || October 8, 2012 || Nogales || M. Schwartz, P. R. Holvorcem ||  || align=right | 2.4 km || 
|-id=320 bgcolor=#d6d6d6
| 555320 ||  || — || October 9, 2013 || Mount Lemmon || Mount Lemmon Survey ||  || align=right | 2.2 km || 
|-id=321 bgcolor=#d6d6d6
| 555321 ||  || — || November 11, 2013 || Mount Lemmon || Mount Lemmon Survey ||  || align=right | 2.3 km || 
|-id=322 bgcolor=#d6d6d6
| 555322 ||  || — || November 9, 2013 || Haleakala || Pan-STARRS ||  || align=right | 2.1 km || 
|-id=323 bgcolor=#d6d6d6
| 555323 ||  || — || November 12, 2013 || Mount Lemmon || Mount Lemmon Survey ||  || align=right | 2.3 km || 
|-id=324 bgcolor=#d6d6d6
| 555324 ||  || — || November 14, 2013 || Mount Lemmon || Mount Lemmon Survey ||  || align=right | 2.1 km || 
|-id=325 bgcolor=#E9E9E9
| 555325 ||  || — || November 6, 2013 || Haleakala || Pan-STARRS ||  || align=right | 2.3 km || 
|-id=326 bgcolor=#d6d6d6
| 555326 ||  || — || November 9, 2013 || Haleakala || Pan-STARRS ||  || align=right | 2.1 km || 
|-id=327 bgcolor=#d6d6d6
| 555327 ||  || — || November 9, 2013 || Catalina || CSS ||  || align=right | 2.1 km || 
|-id=328 bgcolor=#d6d6d6
| 555328 ||  || — || November 9, 2013 || Haleakala || Pan-STARRS ||  || align=right | 2.0 km || 
|-id=329 bgcolor=#d6d6d6
| 555329 ||  || — || November 11, 2013 || Kitt Peak || Spacewatch ||  || align=right | 2.3 km || 
|-id=330 bgcolor=#d6d6d6
| 555330 ||  || — || February 17, 2015 || Haleakala || Pan-STARRS ||  || align=right | 2.0 km || 
|-id=331 bgcolor=#d6d6d6
| 555331 ||  || — || November 6, 2013 || Haleakala || Pan-STARRS ||  || align=right | 2.4 km || 
|-id=332 bgcolor=#d6d6d6
| 555332 ||  || — || November 10, 2013 || Mount Lemmon || Mount Lemmon Survey ||  || align=right | 1.9 km || 
|-id=333 bgcolor=#d6d6d6
| 555333 ||  || — || November 2, 2013 || Mount Lemmon || Mount Lemmon Survey ||  || align=right | 2.1 km || 
|-id=334 bgcolor=#d6d6d6
| 555334 ||  || — || November 10, 2013 || Mount Lemmon || Mount Lemmon Survey ||  || align=right | 1.9 km || 
|-id=335 bgcolor=#E9E9E9
| 555335 ||  || — || November 1, 2013 || Mount Lemmon || Mount Lemmon Survey ||  || align=right | 1.4 km || 
|-id=336 bgcolor=#d6d6d6
| 555336 ||  || — || November 14, 2013 || Mount Lemmon || Mount Lemmon Survey ||  || align=right | 2.4 km || 
|-id=337 bgcolor=#d6d6d6
| 555337 ||  || — || November 8, 2013 || Kitt Peak || Spacewatch ||  || align=right | 2.1 km || 
|-id=338 bgcolor=#E9E9E9
| 555338 ||  || — || November 9, 2013 || Mount Lemmon || Mount Lemmon Survey ||  || align=right | 1.9 km || 
|-id=339 bgcolor=#d6d6d6
| 555339 ||  || — || November 10, 2013 || Mount Lemmon || Mount Lemmon Survey ||  || align=right | 2.3 km || 
|-id=340 bgcolor=#d6d6d6
| 555340 ||  || — || November 12, 2013 || Kitt Peak || Spacewatch ||  || align=right | 2.1 km || 
|-id=341 bgcolor=#d6d6d6
| 555341 ||  || — || November 12, 2013 || Mount Lemmon || Mount Lemmon Survey ||  || align=right | 2.1 km || 
|-id=342 bgcolor=#d6d6d6
| 555342 ||  || — || November 1, 2013 || Mount Lemmon || Mount Lemmon Survey ||  || align=right | 2.3 km || 
|-id=343 bgcolor=#d6d6d6
| 555343 ||  || — || November 10, 2013 || Mount Lemmon || Mount Lemmon Survey ||  || align=right | 2.8 km || 
|-id=344 bgcolor=#d6d6d6
| 555344 ||  || — || November 9, 2013 || Mount Lemmon || Mount Lemmon Survey || 3:2 || align=right | 3.2 km || 
|-id=345 bgcolor=#fefefe
| 555345 ||  || — || November 11, 2013 || Mount Lemmon || Mount Lemmon Survey ||  || align=right data-sort-value="0.58" | 580 m || 
|-id=346 bgcolor=#fefefe
| 555346 ||  || — || November 9, 2013 || Haleakala || Pan-STARRS ||  || align=right data-sort-value="0.49" | 490 m || 
|-id=347 bgcolor=#d6d6d6
| 555347 ||  || — || November 25, 2013 || Nogales || M. Schwartz, P. R. Holvorcem ||  || align=right | 2.2 km || 
|-id=348 bgcolor=#d6d6d6
| 555348 ||  || — || November 26, 2013 || Haleakala || Pan-STARRS ||  || align=right | 2.3 km || 
|-id=349 bgcolor=#E9E9E9
| 555349 ||  || — || August 7, 2000 || Haleakala || AMOS ||  || align=right | 1.3 km || 
|-id=350 bgcolor=#d6d6d6
| 555350 ||  || — || November 6, 2013 || Haleakala || Pan-STARRS ||  || align=right | 2.4 km || 
|-id=351 bgcolor=#d6d6d6
| 555351 ||  || — || November 2, 2008 || Mount Lemmon || Mount Lemmon Survey ||  || align=right | 2.6 km || 
|-id=352 bgcolor=#d6d6d6
| 555352 ||  || — || November 1, 2013 || Kitt Peak || Spacewatch ||  || align=right | 2.3 km || 
|-id=353 bgcolor=#d6d6d6
| 555353 ||  || — || November 27, 2013 || Haleakala || Pan-STARRS ||  || align=right | 2.9 km || 
|-id=354 bgcolor=#d6d6d6
| 555354 ||  || — || November 27, 2013 || Haleakala || Pan-STARRS ||  || align=right | 2.2 km || 
|-id=355 bgcolor=#d6d6d6
| 555355 ||  || — || November 2, 2013 || Mount Lemmon || Mount Lemmon Survey ||  || align=right | 2.9 km || 
|-id=356 bgcolor=#d6d6d6
| 555356 ||  || — || November 27, 2013 || Haleakala || Pan-STARRS ||  || align=right | 2.0 km || 
|-id=357 bgcolor=#d6d6d6
| 555357 ||  || — || November 27, 2013 || Haleakala || Pan-STARRS ||  || align=right | 2.0 km || 
|-id=358 bgcolor=#d6d6d6
| 555358 ||  || — || November 27, 2013 || Haleakala || Pan-STARRS ||  || align=right | 2.3 km || 
|-id=359 bgcolor=#d6d6d6
| 555359 ||  || — || November 27, 2013 || Haleakala || Pan-STARRS ||  || align=right | 2.7 km || 
|-id=360 bgcolor=#d6d6d6
| 555360 ||  || — || September 19, 2003 || Palomar || NEAT ||  || align=right | 2.4 km || 
|-id=361 bgcolor=#d6d6d6
| 555361 ||  || — || December 17, 2003 || Kitt Peak || Spacewatch ||  || align=right | 2.7 km || 
|-id=362 bgcolor=#d6d6d6
| 555362 ||  || — || November 27, 2013 || Haleakala || Pan-STARRS ||  || align=right | 2.3 km || 
|-id=363 bgcolor=#d6d6d6
| 555363 ||  || — || November 27, 2013 || Haleakala || Pan-STARRS ||  || align=right | 2.3 km || 
|-id=364 bgcolor=#d6d6d6
| 555364 ||  || — || November 25, 2013 || Mountain Meadows || D. R. Skillman ||  || align=right | 2.4 km || 
|-id=365 bgcolor=#E9E9E9
| 555365 ||  || — || June 28, 2008 || Siding Spring || SSS ||  || align=right | 2.3 km || 
|-id=366 bgcolor=#d6d6d6
| 555366 ||  || — || November 2, 2013 || Kitt Peak || Spacewatch ||  || align=right | 2.4 km || 
|-id=367 bgcolor=#d6d6d6
| 555367 ||  || — || November 2, 2013 || Kitt Peak || Spacewatch ||  || align=right | 2.7 km || 
|-id=368 bgcolor=#E9E9E9
| 555368 ||  || — || November 11, 2013 || Mount Lemmon || Mount Lemmon Survey ||  || align=right | 2.7 km || 
|-id=369 bgcolor=#fefefe
| 555369 ||  || — || November 30, 2003 || Kitt Peak || Spacewatch || H || align=right data-sort-value="0.48" | 480 m || 
|-id=370 bgcolor=#d6d6d6
| 555370 ||  || — || July 18, 2013 || Haleakala || Pan-STARRS ||  || align=right | 2.4 km || 
|-id=371 bgcolor=#d6d6d6
| 555371 ||  || — || December 5, 2008 || Mount Lemmon || Mount Lemmon Survey ||  || align=right | 2.9 km || 
|-id=372 bgcolor=#d6d6d6
| 555372 ||  || — || August 13, 2012 || Haleakala || Pan-STARRS ||  || align=right | 3.6 km || 
|-id=373 bgcolor=#d6d6d6
| 555373 ||  || — || November 25, 2013 || Haleakala || Pan-STARRS ||  || align=right | 3.3 km || 
|-id=374 bgcolor=#d6d6d6
| 555374 ||  || — || November 10, 2013 || Mount Lemmon || Mount Lemmon Survey ||  || align=right | 2.3 km || 
|-id=375 bgcolor=#d6d6d6
| 555375 ||  || — || November 8, 2013 || Catalina || CSS ||  || align=right | 2.3 km || 
|-id=376 bgcolor=#fefefe
| 555376 ||  || — || September 19, 1998 || Apache Point || SDSS Collaboration || NYS || align=right data-sort-value="0.67" | 670 m || 
|-id=377 bgcolor=#d6d6d6
| 555377 ||  || — || November 26, 2013 || Haleakala || Pan-STARRS ||  || align=right | 1.9 km || 
|-id=378 bgcolor=#d6d6d6
| 555378 ||  || — || November 9, 2013 || Kitt Peak || Spacewatch ||  || align=right | 1.9 km || 
|-id=379 bgcolor=#d6d6d6
| 555379 ||  || — || October 13, 2013 || Calar Alto-CASADO || G. Proffe, S. Hellmich ||  || align=right | 2.3 km || 
|-id=380 bgcolor=#d6d6d6
| 555380 ||  || — || November 29, 2013 || Elena Remote || A. Oreshko ||  || align=right | 2.8 km || 
|-id=381 bgcolor=#d6d6d6
| 555381 ||  || — || November 8, 2013 || Mount Lemmon || Mount Lemmon Survey ||  || align=right | 2.3 km || 
|-id=382 bgcolor=#d6d6d6
| 555382 ||  || — || March 18, 2010 || Kitt Peak || Mount Lemmon Survey ||  || align=right | 2.8 km || 
|-id=383 bgcolor=#d6d6d6
| 555383 ||  || — || September 10, 2002 || Palomar || NEAT ||  || align=right | 3.2 km || 
|-id=384 bgcolor=#d6d6d6
| 555384 ||  || — || November 7, 2008 || Mount Lemmon || Mount Lemmon Survey ||  || align=right | 2.5 km || 
|-id=385 bgcolor=#d6d6d6
| 555385 ||  || — || October 30, 2013 || Haleakala || Pan-STARRS ||  || align=right | 2.5 km || 
|-id=386 bgcolor=#E9E9E9
| 555386 ||  || — || March 25, 2011 || Haleakala || Pan-STARRS ||  || align=right | 2.1 km || 
|-id=387 bgcolor=#d6d6d6
| 555387 ||  || — || October 26, 2013 || Mount Lemmon || Mount Lemmon Survey ||  || align=right | 2.1 km || 
|-id=388 bgcolor=#d6d6d6
| 555388 ||  || — || November 26, 2013 || Mount Lemmon || Mount Lemmon Survey ||  || align=right | 2.2 km || 
|-id=389 bgcolor=#d6d6d6
| 555389 ||  || — || November 26, 2013 || Mount Lemmon || Mount Lemmon Survey ||  || align=right | 2.0 km || 
|-id=390 bgcolor=#d6d6d6
| 555390 ||  || — || November 26, 2013 || Mount Lemmon || Mount Lemmon Survey ||  || align=right | 3.4 km || 
|-id=391 bgcolor=#E9E9E9
| 555391 ||  || — || April 27, 2012 || Haleakala || Pan-STARRS ||  || align=right | 2.2 km || 
|-id=392 bgcolor=#d6d6d6
| 555392 ||  || — || November 27, 2013 || Haleakala || Pan-STARRS ||  || align=right | 2.2 km || 
|-id=393 bgcolor=#d6d6d6
| 555393 ||  || — || November 19, 2008 || Kitt Peak || Spacewatch ||  || align=right | 1.9 km || 
|-id=394 bgcolor=#d6d6d6
| 555394 ||  || — || October 9, 2013 || Mount Lemmon || Mount Lemmon Survey ||  || align=right | 2.5 km || 
|-id=395 bgcolor=#d6d6d6
| 555395 ||  || — || October 26, 2013 || Kitt Peak || Spacewatch ||  || align=right | 2.3 km || 
|-id=396 bgcolor=#d6d6d6
| 555396 ||  || — || November 29, 2013 || Mount Lemmon || Mount Lemmon Survey ||  || align=right | 2.4 km || 
|-id=397 bgcolor=#d6d6d6
| 555397 ||  || — || October 22, 2013 || Mount Lemmon || Mount Lemmon Survey ||  || align=right | 1.9 km || 
|-id=398 bgcolor=#d6d6d6
| 555398 ||  || — || August 21, 2006 || Kitt Peak || Spacewatch ||  || align=right | 2.1 km || 
|-id=399 bgcolor=#d6d6d6
| 555399 ||  || — || April 10, 2010 || Kitt Peak || Spacewatch || 7:4 || align=right | 4.7 km || 
|-id=400 bgcolor=#d6d6d6
| 555400 ||  || — || September 11, 2007 || Mount Lemmon || Mount Lemmon Survey ||  || align=right | 1.8 km || 
|}

555401–555500 

|-bgcolor=#d6d6d6
| 555401 ||  || — || November 28, 2013 || Mount Lemmon || Mount Lemmon Survey ||  || align=right | 2.3 km || 
|-id=402 bgcolor=#d6d6d6
| 555402 ||  || — || November 27, 2013 || Haleakala || Pan-STARRS ||  || align=right | 2.1 km || 
|-id=403 bgcolor=#E9E9E9
| 555403 ||  || — || August 30, 2008 || Charleston || R. Holmes ||  || align=right | 1.3 km || 
|-id=404 bgcolor=#d6d6d6
| 555404 ||  || — || November 28, 2013 || Mount Lemmon || Mount Lemmon Survey ||  || align=right | 2.7 km || 
|-id=405 bgcolor=#d6d6d6
| 555405 ||  || — || November 27, 2013 || Haleakala || Pan-STARRS ||  || align=right | 2.5 km || 
|-id=406 bgcolor=#d6d6d6
| 555406 ||  || — || November 28, 2013 || Haleakala || Pan-STARRS ||  || align=right | 1.9 km || 
|-id=407 bgcolor=#d6d6d6
| 555407 ||  || — || February 16, 2015 || Haleakala || Pan-STARRS ||  || align=right | 1.9 km || 
|-id=408 bgcolor=#d6d6d6
| 555408 ||  || — || November 2, 2013 || Mount Lemmon || Mount Lemmon Survey ||  || align=right | 1.8 km || 
|-id=409 bgcolor=#d6d6d6
| 555409 ||  || — || November 29, 2013 || Kitt Peak || Spacewatch ||  || align=right | 2.1 km || 
|-id=410 bgcolor=#d6d6d6
| 555410 ||  || — || November 27, 2013 || Haleakala || Pan-STARRS ||  || align=right | 2.2 km || 
|-id=411 bgcolor=#d6d6d6
| 555411 ||  || — || November 27, 2013 || Haleakala || Pan-STARRS ||  || align=right | 2.1 km || 
|-id=412 bgcolor=#d6d6d6
| 555412 ||  || — || November 27, 2013 || Haleakala || Pan-STARRS ||  || align=right | 2.5 km || 
|-id=413 bgcolor=#d6d6d6
| 555413 ||  || — || November 27, 2013 || Haleakala || Pan-STARRS ||  || align=right | 2.1 km || 
|-id=414 bgcolor=#d6d6d6
| 555414 ||  || — || November 27, 2013 || Haleakala || Pan-STARRS ||  || align=right | 2.4 km || 
|-id=415 bgcolor=#d6d6d6
| 555415 ||  || — || November 27, 2013 || Haleakala || Pan-STARRS ||  || align=right | 2.1 km || 
|-id=416 bgcolor=#fefefe
| 555416 ||  || — || November 26, 2013 || Mount Lemmon || Mount Lemmon Survey ||  || align=right data-sort-value="0.65" | 650 m || 
|-id=417 bgcolor=#d6d6d6
| 555417 ||  || — || December 2, 2013 || Elena Remote || A. Oreshko ||  || align=right | 2.5 km || 
|-id=418 bgcolor=#d6d6d6
| 555418 ||  || — || November 26, 2013 || Haleakala || Pan-STARRS ||  || align=right | 2.7 km || 
|-id=419 bgcolor=#d6d6d6
| 555419 ||  || — || November 20, 2006 || Kitt Peak || Spacewatch ||  || align=right | 2.9 km || 
|-id=420 bgcolor=#d6d6d6
| 555420 ||  || — || June 4, 2011 || Mount Lemmon || Mount Lemmon Survey ||  || align=right | 4.3 km || 
|-id=421 bgcolor=#d6d6d6
| 555421 ||  || — || November 28, 2013 || Mount Lemmon || Mount Lemmon Survey ||  || align=right | 2.5 km || 
|-id=422 bgcolor=#d6d6d6
| 555422 ||  || — || November 1, 2013 || Kitt Peak || Spacewatch ||  || align=right | 2.4 km || 
|-id=423 bgcolor=#d6d6d6
| 555423 ||  || — || October 31, 2013 || Mount Lemmon || Mount Lemmon Survey ||  || align=right | 3.1 km || 
|-id=424 bgcolor=#d6d6d6
| 555424 ||  || — || December 11, 2013 || Mount Lemmon || Mount Lemmon Survey ||  || align=right | 3.2 km || 
|-id=425 bgcolor=#E9E9E9
| 555425 ||  || — || December 12, 2013 || Mount Lemmon || Mount Lemmon Survey ||  || align=right | 1.6 km || 
|-id=426 bgcolor=#C2E0FF
| 555426 ||  || — || February 26, 2012 || Haleakala || Pan-STARRS || other TNOcritical || align=right | 162 km || 
|-id=427 bgcolor=#d6d6d6
| 555427 ||  || — || January 15, 2009 || Kitt Peak || Spacewatch ||  || align=right | 3.5 km || 
|-id=428 bgcolor=#d6d6d6
| 555428 ||  || — || January 29, 2015 || Haleakala || Pan-STARRS ||  || align=right | 2.5 km || 
|-id=429 bgcolor=#d6d6d6
| 555429 ||  || — || December 11, 2013 || Haleakala || Pan-STARRS ||  || align=right | 2.1 km || 
|-id=430 bgcolor=#d6d6d6
| 555430 ||  || — || December 11, 2013 || Mount Lemmon || Mount Lemmon Survey ||  || align=right | 2.7 km || 
|-id=431 bgcolor=#d6d6d6
| 555431 ||  || — || December 11, 2013 || Haleakala || Pan-STARRS ||  || align=right | 2.1 km || 
|-id=432 bgcolor=#d6d6d6
| 555432 ||  || — || December 13, 2013 || Mount Lemmon || Mount Lemmon Survey ||  || align=right | 2.4 km || 
|-id=433 bgcolor=#d6d6d6
| 555433 ||  || — || January 29, 2003 || Apache Point || SDSS Collaboration ||  || align=right | 2.3 km || 
|-id=434 bgcolor=#d6d6d6
| 555434 ||  || — || December 7, 2013 || Mount Lemmon || Mount Lemmon Survey ||  || align=right | 1.9 km || 
|-id=435 bgcolor=#d6d6d6
| 555435 ||  || — || December 3, 2013 || Mount Lemmon || Mount Lemmon Survey ||  || align=right | 2.4 km || 
|-id=436 bgcolor=#d6d6d6
| 555436 ||  || — || December 23, 2013 || Mount Lemmon || Mount Lemmon Survey ||  || align=right | 2.9 km || 
|-id=437 bgcolor=#d6d6d6
| 555437 ||  || — || December 23, 2013 || Mount Lemmon || Mount Lemmon Survey ||  || align=right | 2.5 km || 
|-id=438 bgcolor=#d6d6d6
| 555438 ||  || — || November 2, 2007 || Kitt Peak || Spacewatch ||  || align=right | 2.2 km || 
|-id=439 bgcolor=#d6d6d6
| 555439 ||  || — || November 12, 2001 || Apache Point || SDSS Collaboration || VER || align=right | 2.8 km || 
|-id=440 bgcolor=#fefefe
| 555440 ||  || — || December 24, 2013 || Mount Lemmon || Mount Lemmon Survey ||  || align=right data-sort-value="0.55" | 550 m || 
|-id=441 bgcolor=#d6d6d6
| 555441 ||  || — || December 24, 2013 || Mount Lemmon || Mount Lemmon Survey ||  || align=right | 2.5 km || 
|-id=442 bgcolor=#fefefe
| 555442 ||  || — || September 18, 2003 || Palomar || NEAT ||  || align=right data-sort-value="0.63" | 630 m || 
|-id=443 bgcolor=#d6d6d6
| 555443 ||  || — || December 13, 2013 || Mount Lemmon || Mount Lemmon Survey ||  || align=right | 2.6 km || 
|-id=444 bgcolor=#d6d6d6
| 555444 ||  || — || September 15, 2007 || Mount Lemmon || Mount Lemmon Survey ||  || align=right | 2.5 km || 
|-id=445 bgcolor=#d6d6d6
| 555445 ||  || — || February 9, 2004 || Palomar || NEAT ||  || align=right | 3.6 km || 
|-id=446 bgcolor=#d6d6d6
| 555446 ||  || — || December 24, 2013 || Mount Lemmon || Mount Lemmon Survey ||  || align=right | 2.2 km || 
|-id=447 bgcolor=#d6d6d6
| 555447 ||  || — || April 10, 2005 || Kitt Peak || Kitt Peak Obs. || EOS || align=right | 1.7 km || 
|-id=448 bgcolor=#E9E9E9
| 555448 ||  || — || November 14, 2013 || Oukaimeden || C. Rinner ||  || align=right | 1.4 km || 
|-id=449 bgcolor=#d6d6d6
| 555449 ||  || — || March 11, 2005 || Mount Lemmon || Mount Lemmon Survey ||  || align=right | 2.2 km || 
|-id=450 bgcolor=#fefefe
| 555450 ||  || — || February 25, 2007 || Mount Lemmon || Mount Lemmon Survey ||  || align=right data-sort-value="0.75" | 750 m || 
|-id=451 bgcolor=#d6d6d6
| 555451 ||  || — || November 28, 2013 || Haleakala || Pan-STARRS ||  || align=right | 2.4 km || 
|-id=452 bgcolor=#d6d6d6
| 555452 ||  || — || December 10, 2013 || Mount Lemmon || Mount Lemmon Survey ||  || align=right | 2.7 km || 
|-id=453 bgcolor=#d6d6d6
| 555453 ||  || — || October 31, 2007 || Catalina || CSS || EOS || align=right | 2.4 km || 
|-id=454 bgcolor=#d6d6d6
| 555454 ||  || — || November 1, 2013 || Kitt Peak || Spacewatch ||  || align=right | 2.5 km || 
|-id=455 bgcolor=#d6d6d6
| 555455 ||  || — || August 12, 2012 || Kitt Peak || Spacewatch ||  || align=right | 2.7 km || 
|-id=456 bgcolor=#d6d6d6
| 555456 ||  || — || October 26, 2013 || Mount Lemmon || Mount Lemmon Survey ||  || align=right | 2.9 km || 
|-id=457 bgcolor=#d6d6d6
| 555457 ||  || — || December 27, 2013 || Mount Lemmon || Mount Lemmon Survey ||  || align=right | 2.1 km || 
|-id=458 bgcolor=#d6d6d6
| 555458 ||  || — || October 15, 2007 || Catalina || CSS ||  || align=right | 3.0 km || 
|-id=459 bgcolor=#d6d6d6
| 555459 ||  || — || November 24, 2013 || Haleakala || Pan-STARRS ||  || align=right | 2.3 km || 
|-id=460 bgcolor=#E9E9E9
| 555460 ||  || — || May 1, 2006 || Kitt Peak || Spacewatch ||  || align=right | 1.1 km || 
|-id=461 bgcolor=#d6d6d6
| 555461 ||  || — || September 1, 2002 || Palomar || NEAT ||  || align=right | 3.3 km || 
|-id=462 bgcolor=#d6d6d6
| 555462 ||  || — || December 26, 2013 || Kitt Peak || Spacewatch ||  || align=right | 2.1 km || 
|-id=463 bgcolor=#d6d6d6
| 555463 ||  || — || August 13, 2012 || Kitt Peak || Spacewatch ||  || align=right | 2.6 km || 
|-id=464 bgcolor=#d6d6d6
| 555464 ||  || — || December 26, 2013 || Haleakala || Pan-STARRS ||  || align=right | 2.2 km || 
|-id=465 bgcolor=#fefefe
| 555465 ||  || — || November 14, 2003 || Palomar || NEAT ||  || align=right data-sort-value="0.81" | 810 m || 
|-id=466 bgcolor=#d6d6d6
| 555466 ||  || — || December 27, 2013 || Kitt Peak || Spacewatch ||  || align=right | 2.2 km || 
|-id=467 bgcolor=#d6d6d6
| 555467 ||  || — || December 5, 2007 || Mount Lemmon || Mount Lemmon Survey ||  || align=right | 2.4 km || 
|-id=468 bgcolor=#E9E9E9
| 555468 Tokarczuk ||  ||  || September 12, 2013 || Tincana || M. Żołnowski, M. Kusiak ||  || align=right | 2.4 km || 
|-id=469 bgcolor=#fefefe
| 555469 ||  || — || January 8, 2007 || Kitt Peak || Spacewatch ||  || align=right data-sort-value="0.91" | 910 m || 
|-id=470 bgcolor=#d6d6d6
| 555470 ||  || — || December 11, 2013 || Mount Lemmon || Mount Lemmon Survey ||  || align=right | 2.1 km || 
|-id=471 bgcolor=#d6d6d6
| 555471 ||  || — || October 16, 2007 || Kitt Peak || Spacewatch ||  || align=right | 1.9 km || 
|-id=472 bgcolor=#d6d6d6
| 555472 ||  || — || November 28, 2013 || Mount Lemmon || Mount Lemmon Survey ||  || align=right | 2.5 km || 
|-id=473 bgcolor=#d6d6d6
| 555473 ||  || — || December 25, 2013 || Mount Lemmon || Mount Lemmon Survey ||  || align=right | 2.3 km || 
|-id=474 bgcolor=#d6d6d6
| 555474 ||  || — || August 1, 2001 || Palomar || NEAT ||  || align=right | 3.4 km || 
|-id=475 bgcolor=#d6d6d6
| 555475 ||  || — || November 4, 2007 || Kitt Peak || Spacewatch ||  || align=right | 2.7 km || 
|-id=476 bgcolor=#d6d6d6
| 555476 ||  || — || December 26, 2013 || Haleakala || Pan-STARRS ||  || align=right | 2.7 km || 
|-id=477 bgcolor=#d6d6d6
| 555477 ||  || — || November 17, 2007 || Kitt Peak || Spacewatch ||  || align=right | 2.4 km || 
|-id=478 bgcolor=#d6d6d6
| 555478 ||  || — || December 27, 2013 || Kitt Peak || Spacewatch ||  || align=right | 2.8 km || 
|-id=479 bgcolor=#d6d6d6
| 555479 ||  || — || December 27, 2013 || Kitt Peak || Spacewatch ||  || align=right | 2.4 km || 
|-id=480 bgcolor=#fefefe
| 555480 ||  || — || December 27, 2013 || Kitt Peak || Spacewatch ||  || align=right data-sort-value="0.47" | 470 m || 
|-id=481 bgcolor=#d6d6d6
| 555481 ||  || — || March 8, 2003 || Palomar || NEAT ||  || align=right | 4.3 km || 
|-id=482 bgcolor=#E9E9E9
| 555482 ||  || — || October 3, 2013 || Kitt Peak || Spacewatch ||  || align=right | 2.0 km || 
|-id=483 bgcolor=#d6d6d6
| 555483 ||  || — || December 30, 2013 || Mount Lemmon || Mount Lemmon Survey ||  || align=right | 2.9 km || 
|-id=484 bgcolor=#d6d6d6
| 555484 ||  || — || September 13, 2007 || Mount Lemmon || Mount Lemmon Survey ||  || align=right | 2.3 km || 
|-id=485 bgcolor=#d6d6d6
| 555485 ||  || — || November 28, 2013 || Mount Lemmon || Mount Lemmon Survey ||  || align=right | 2.1 km || 
|-id=486 bgcolor=#d6d6d6
| 555486 ||  || — || April 10, 2010 || Mount Lemmon || Mount Lemmon Survey ||  || align=right | 2.9 km || 
|-id=487 bgcolor=#d6d6d6
| 555487 ||  || — || October 7, 2002 || Haleakala || AMOS ||  || align=right | 3.3 km || 
|-id=488 bgcolor=#d6d6d6
| 555488 ||  || — || September 19, 2001 || Kitt Peak || SDSS ||  || align=right | 3.7 km || 
|-id=489 bgcolor=#d6d6d6
| 555489 ||  || — || August 27, 2005 || Anderson Mesa || LONEOS ||  || align=right | 4.6 km || 
|-id=490 bgcolor=#d6d6d6
| 555490 ||  || — || January 31, 2009 || Mount Lemmon || Mount Lemmon Survey ||  || align=right | 2.7 km || 
|-id=491 bgcolor=#d6d6d6
| 555491 ||  || — || October 8, 2012 || Haleakala || Pan-STARRS ||  || align=right | 2.2 km || 
|-id=492 bgcolor=#fefefe
| 555492 ||  || — || February 8, 2011 || Mount Lemmon || Mount Lemmon Survey ||  || align=right data-sort-value="0.47" | 470 m || 
|-id=493 bgcolor=#d6d6d6
| 555493 ||  || — || December 10, 2013 || Mount Lemmon || Mount Lemmon Survey ||  || align=right | 2.3 km || 
|-id=494 bgcolor=#d6d6d6
| 555494 ||  || — || December 28, 2013 || Kitt Peak || Spacewatch ||  || align=right | 2.4 km || 
|-id=495 bgcolor=#d6d6d6
| 555495 ||  || — || December 28, 2013 || Kitt Peak || Spacewatch ||  || align=right | 2.7 km || 
|-id=496 bgcolor=#d6d6d6
| 555496 ||  || — || October 21, 2006 || Mount Lemmon || Mount Lemmon Survey ||  || align=right | 2.9 km || 
|-id=497 bgcolor=#d6d6d6
| 555497 ||  || — || December 28, 2013 || Kitt Peak || Spacewatch ||  || align=right | 2.5 km || 
|-id=498 bgcolor=#d6d6d6
| 555498 ||  || — || November 13, 2007 || Kitt Peak || Spacewatch ||  || align=right | 2.2 km || 
|-id=499 bgcolor=#d6d6d6
| 555499 ||  || — || December 25, 1998 || Kitt Peak || Spacewatch ||  || align=right | 2.1 km || 
|-id=500 bgcolor=#fefefe
| 555500 ||  || — || December 7, 2013 || Kitt Peak || Spacewatch ||  || align=right data-sort-value="0.60" | 600 m || 
|}

555501–555600 

|-bgcolor=#d6d6d6
| 555501 ||  || — || July 27, 2011 || Haleakala || Pan-STARRS ||  || align=right | 2.4 km || 
|-id=502 bgcolor=#d6d6d6
| 555502 ||  || — || December 20, 2007 || Kitt Peak || Spacewatch ||  || align=right | 2.8 km || 
|-id=503 bgcolor=#d6d6d6
| 555503 ||  || — || April 9, 2010 || Mount Lemmon || Mount Lemmon Survey ||  || align=right | 2.4 km || 
|-id=504 bgcolor=#d6d6d6
| 555504 ||  || — || August 14, 2012 || Kitt Peak || Spacewatch ||  || align=right | 2.2 km || 
|-id=505 bgcolor=#d6d6d6
| 555505 ||  || — || October 18, 2012 || Haleakala || Pan-STARRS ||  || align=right | 2.4 km || 
|-id=506 bgcolor=#d6d6d6
| 555506 ||  || — || December 22, 2008 || Mount Lemmon || Mount Lemmon Survey ||  || align=right | 3.0 km || 
|-id=507 bgcolor=#d6d6d6
| 555507 ||  || — || October 30, 2013 || Haleakala || Pan-STARRS ||  || align=right | 2.3 km || 
|-id=508 bgcolor=#d6d6d6
| 555508 ||  || — || December 25, 2013 || Kitt Peak || Spacewatch ||  || align=right | 2.4 km || 
|-id=509 bgcolor=#d6d6d6
| 555509 ||  || — || December 30, 2013 || Haleakala || Pan-STARRS ||  || align=right | 2.2 km || 
|-id=510 bgcolor=#d6d6d6
| 555510 ||  || — || November 2, 2013 || Mount Lemmon || Mount Lemmon Survey ||  || align=right | 2.2 km || 
|-id=511 bgcolor=#d6d6d6
| 555511 ||  || — || December 1, 2008 || Mount Lemmon || Mount Lemmon Survey ||  || align=right | 2.9 km || 
|-id=512 bgcolor=#E9E9E9
| 555512 ||  || — || September 30, 2005 || Mount Lemmon || Mount Lemmon Survey ||  || align=right data-sort-value="0.93" | 930 m || 
|-id=513 bgcolor=#fefefe
| 555513 ||  || — || February 26, 2011 || Mount Lemmon || Mount Lemmon Survey ||  || align=right data-sort-value="0.81" | 810 m || 
|-id=514 bgcolor=#d6d6d6
| 555514 ||  || — || December 14, 2007 || Kitt Peak || Spacewatch ||  || align=right | 2.3 km || 
|-id=515 bgcolor=#d6d6d6
| 555515 ||  || — || August 11, 2001 || Palomar || NEAT ||  || align=right | 2.8 km || 
|-id=516 bgcolor=#d6d6d6
| 555516 ||  || — || November 28, 2013 || Kitt Peak || Spacewatch ||  || align=right | 2.9 km || 
|-id=517 bgcolor=#d6d6d6
| 555517 ||  || — || November 12, 2001 || Apache Point || SDSS Collaboration ||  || align=right | 2.1 km || 
|-id=518 bgcolor=#fefefe
| 555518 ||  || — || December 30, 2013 || Haleakala || Pan-STARRS ||  || align=right data-sort-value="0.69" | 690 m || 
|-id=519 bgcolor=#fefefe
| 555519 ||  || — || January 9, 2011 || Mount Lemmon || Mount Lemmon Survey ||  || align=right data-sort-value="0.73" | 730 m || 
|-id=520 bgcolor=#d6d6d6
| 555520 ||  || — || November 11, 2001 || Apache Point || SDSS Collaboration || EOS || align=right | 2.3 km || 
|-id=521 bgcolor=#fefefe
| 555521 ||  || — || December 30, 2013 || Kitt Peak || Spacewatch ||  || align=right data-sort-value="0.61" | 610 m || 
|-id=522 bgcolor=#d6d6d6
| 555522 ||  || — || August 12, 2006 || Palomar || NEAT || EOS || align=right | 2.3 km || 
|-id=523 bgcolor=#d6d6d6
| 555523 ||  || — || October 13, 2007 || Anderson Mesa || LONEOS ||  || align=right | 2.6 km || 
|-id=524 bgcolor=#d6d6d6
| 555524 ||  || — || December 31, 2013 || Mount Lemmon || Mount Lemmon Survey ||  || align=right | 2.4 km || 
|-id=525 bgcolor=#d6d6d6
| 555525 ||  || — || November 2, 2007 || Kitt Peak || Spacewatch ||  || align=right | 2.6 km || 
|-id=526 bgcolor=#d6d6d6
| 555526 ||  || — || December 4, 2013 || Haleakala || Pan-STARRS ||  || align=right | 2.7 km || 
|-id=527 bgcolor=#d6d6d6
| 555527 ||  || — || December 21, 2008 || Kitt Peak || Spacewatch ||  || align=right | 2.1 km || 
|-id=528 bgcolor=#fefefe
| 555528 ||  || — || December 14, 2010 || Mount Lemmon || Mount Lemmon Survey ||  || align=right data-sort-value="0.45" | 450 m || 
|-id=529 bgcolor=#d6d6d6
| 555529 ||  || — || October 13, 2002 || Kitt Peak || Spacewatch ||  || align=right | 3.1 km || 
|-id=530 bgcolor=#d6d6d6
| 555530 ||  || — || December 31, 2013 || Mount Lemmon || Mount Lemmon Survey ||  || align=right | 2.7 km || 
|-id=531 bgcolor=#d6d6d6
| 555531 ||  || — || January 16, 2009 || Kitt Peak || Spacewatch || THM || align=right | 1.7 km || 
|-id=532 bgcolor=#fefefe
| 555532 ||  || — || December 3, 2013 || Mount Lemmon || Mount Lemmon Survey ||  || align=right data-sort-value="0.55" | 550 m || 
|-id=533 bgcolor=#d6d6d6
| 555533 ||  || — || December 3, 2013 || Mount Lemmon || Mount Lemmon Survey ||  || align=right | 2.1 km || 
|-id=534 bgcolor=#d6d6d6
| 555534 ||  || — || May 8, 2010 || Mount Lemmon || Mount Lemmon Survey ||  || align=right | 2.5 km || 
|-id=535 bgcolor=#d6d6d6
| 555535 ||  || — || December 4, 2007 || Mount Lemmon || Mount Lemmon Survey ||  || align=right | 1.9 km || 
|-id=536 bgcolor=#d6d6d6
| 555536 ||  || — || December 31, 2013 || Mount Lemmon || Mount Lemmon Survey ||  || align=right | 2.3 km || 
|-id=537 bgcolor=#d6d6d6
| 555537 ||  || — || December 29, 2013 || Haleakala || Pan-STARRS ||  || align=right | 2.0 km || 
|-id=538 bgcolor=#d6d6d6
| 555538 ||  || — || December 30, 2013 || Mount Lemmon || Mount Lemmon Survey ||  || align=right | 2.9 km || 
|-id=539 bgcolor=#d6d6d6
| 555539 ||  || — || December 31, 2013 || Mount Lemmon || Mount Lemmon Survey ||  || align=right | 2.2 km || 
|-id=540 bgcolor=#d6d6d6
| 555540 ||  || — || October 6, 2012 || Haleakala || Pan-STARRS ||  || align=right | 2.6 km || 
|-id=541 bgcolor=#d6d6d6
| 555541 ||  || — || February 23, 2015 || Haleakala || Pan-STARRS ||  || align=right | 3.0 km || 
|-id=542 bgcolor=#fefefe
| 555542 ||  || — || December 23, 2013 || Mount Lemmon || Mount Lemmon Survey ||  || align=right data-sort-value="0.55" | 550 m || 
|-id=543 bgcolor=#d6d6d6
| 555543 ||  || — || December 29, 2013 || Haleakala || Pan-STARRS ||  || align=right | 2.8 km || 
|-id=544 bgcolor=#d6d6d6
| 555544 ||  || — || December 29, 2013 || Haleakala || Pan-STARRS ||  || align=right | 1.9 km || 
|-id=545 bgcolor=#d6d6d6
| 555545 ||  || — || December 24, 2013 || Mount Lemmon || Mount Lemmon Survey ||  || align=right | 2.2 km || 
|-id=546 bgcolor=#d6d6d6
| 555546 ||  || — || November 12, 2001 || Palomar || SDSS ||  || align=right | 2.8 km || 
|-id=547 bgcolor=#d6d6d6
| 555547 ||  || — || December 28, 2013 || Mount Lemmon || Mount Lemmon Survey ||  || align=right | 2.4 km || 
|-id=548 bgcolor=#fefefe
| 555548 ||  || — || December 31, 2013 || Kitt Peak || Spacewatch ||  || align=right data-sort-value="0.54" | 540 m || 
|-id=549 bgcolor=#d6d6d6
| 555549 ||  || — || January 15, 2009 || Kitt Peak || Spacewatch || THM || align=right | 1.8 km || 
|-id=550 bgcolor=#d6d6d6
| 555550 ||  || — || January 1, 2014 || Haleakala || Pan-STARRS ||  || align=right | 3.6 km || 
|-id=551 bgcolor=#d6d6d6
| 555551 ||  || — || November 21, 2001 || Kitt Peak || Spacewatch ||  || align=right | 3.3 km || 
|-id=552 bgcolor=#fefefe
| 555552 ||  || — || January 10, 2007 || Kitt Peak || Spacewatch ||  || align=right data-sort-value="0.57" | 570 m || 
|-id=553 bgcolor=#d6d6d6
| 555553 ||  || — || January 29, 2003 || Kitt Peak || Spacewatch ||  || align=right | 3.6 km || 
|-id=554 bgcolor=#fefefe
| 555554 ||  || — || January 1, 2014 || Haleakala || Pan-STARRS ||  || align=right data-sort-value="0.54" | 540 m || 
|-id=555 bgcolor=#d6d6d6
| 555555 ||  || — || November 18, 2007 || Mount Lemmon || Mount Lemmon Survey ||  || align=right | 2.6 km || 
|-id=556 bgcolor=#fefefe
| 555556 ||  || — || September 20, 2009 || Kitt Peak || Spacewatch ||  || align=right data-sort-value="0.71" | 710 m || 
|-id=557 bgcolor=#d6d6d6
| 555557 ||  || — || July 19, 2007 || Kitt Peak || Mount Lemmon Survey ||  || align=right | 2.9 km || 
|-id=558 bgcolor=#d6d6d6
| 555558 ||  || — || December 29, 2008 || Mount Lemmon || Mount Lemmon Survey ||  || align=right | 2.5 km || 
|-id=559 bgcolor=#d6d6d6
| 555559 ||  || — || January 1, 2014 || Kitt Peak || Spacewatch ||  || align=right | 2.6 km || 
|-id=560 bgcolor=#d6d6d6
| 555560 ||  || — || June 1, 2005 || Mount Lemmon || Mount Lemmon Survey ||  || align=right | 2.6 km || 
|-id=561 bgcolor=#fefefe
| 555561 ||  || — || January 1, 2014 || Haleakala || Pan-STARRS || H || align=right data-sort-value="0.52" | 520 m || 
|-id=562 bgcolor=#d6d6d6
| 555562 ||  || — || October 6, 2012 || Haleakala || Pan-STARRS ||  || align=right | 2.9 km || 
|-id=563 bgcolor=#d6d6d6
| 555563 ||  || — || October 28, 2013 || Kitt Peak || Spacewatch ||  || align=right | 3.0 km || 
|-id=564 bgcolor=#d6d6d6
| 555564 ||  || — || January 3, 2014 || Kitt Peak || Spacewatch ||  || align=right | 2.3 km || 
|-id=565 bgcolor=#d6d6d6
| 555565 ||  || — || November 11, 2001 || Apache Point || SDSS Collaboration ||  || align=right | 2.6 km || 
|-id=566 bgcolor=#fefefe
| 555566 ||  || — || August 13, 2012 || Haleakala || Pan-STARRS ||  || align=right data-sort-value="0.56" | 560 m || 
|-id=567 bgcolor=#d6d6d6
| 555567 ||  || — || December 31, 2013 || Mount Lemmon || Mount Lemmon Survey ||  || align=right | 2.7 km || 
|-id=568 bgcolor=#d6d6d6
| 555568 ||  || — || December 24, 2013 || Mount Lemmon || Mount Lemmon Survey ||  || align=right | 3.0 km || 
|-id=569 bgcolor=#d6d6d6
| 555569 ||  || — || October 11, 2012 || Haleakala || Pan-STARRS ||  || align=right | 2.1 km || 
|-id=570 bgcolor=#d6d6d6
| 555570 ||  || — || September 25, 2012 || Kitt Peak || Spacewatch ||  || align=right | 2.4 km || 
|-id=571 bgcolor=#fefefe
| 555571 ||  || — || November 16, 2006 || Kitt Peak || Spacewatch ||  || align=right data-sort-value="0.58" | 580 m || 
|-id=572 bgcolor=#d6d6d6
| 555572 ||  || — || January 4, 2014 || Mount Lemmon || Mount Lemmon Survey ||  || align=right | 2.7 km || 
|-id=573 bgcolor=#d6d6d6
| 555573 ||  || — || October 19, 2007 || Mount Lemmon || Mount Lemmon Survey ||  || align=right | 3.2 km || 
|-id=574 bgcolor=#d6d6d6
| 555574 ||  || — || January 2, 2014 || Kitt Peak || Spacewatch ||  || align=right | 2.6 km || 
|-id=575 bgcolor=#d6d6d6
| 555575 ||  || — || May 1, 2011 || Haleakala || Pan-STARRS ||  || align=right | 2.7 km || 
|-id=576 bgcolor=#d6d6d6
| 555576 ||  || — || October 9, 2007 || Kitt Peak || Spacewatch ||  || align=right | 2.8 km || 
|-id=577 bgcolor=#fefefe
| 555577 ||  || — || December 25, 2013 || Mount Lemmon || Mount Lemmon Survey ||  || align=right data-sort-value="0.60" | 600 m || 
|-id=578 bgcolor=#d6d6d6
| 555578 ||  || — || March 20, 2003 || Palomar || NEAT || Tj (2.99) || align=right | 5.3 km || 
|-id=579 bgcolor=#d6d6d6
| 555579 ||  || — || January 4, 2014 || Mount Lemmon || Mount Lemmon Survey ||  || align=right | 2.7 km || 
|-id=580 bgcolor=#d6d6d6
| 555580 ||  || — || October 6, 2012 || Haleakala || Pan-STARRS ||  || align=right | 3.1 km || 
|-id=581 bgcolor=#fefefe
| 555581 ||  || — || April 7, 2008 || Kitt Peak || Spacewatch ||  || align=right data-sort-value="0.58" | 580 m || 
|-id=582 bgcolor=#fefefe
| 555582 ||  || — || December 21, 2003 || Socorro || LINEAR ||  || align=right data-sort-value="0.94" | 940 m || 
|-id=583 bgcolor=#fefefe
| 555583 ||  || — || December 26, 2013 || Kitt Peak || Spacewatch ||  || align=right data-sort-value="0.50" | 500 m || 
|-id=584 bgcolor=#fefefe
| 555584 ||  || — || January 7, 2014 || Kitt Peak || Spacewatch ||  || align=right data-sort-value="0.62" | 620 m || 
|-id=585 bgcolor=#fefefe
| 555585 ||  || — || November 22, 2006 || Mount Lemmon || Mount Lemmon Survey ||  || align=right data-sort-value="0.61" | 610 m || 
|-id=586 bgcolor=#d6d6d6
| 555586 ||  || — || March 16, 2004 || Kitt Peak || Spacewatch || EOS || align=right | 2.4 km || 
|-id=587 bgcolor=#fefefe
| 555587 ||  || — || November 8, 2009 || Mount Lemmon || Mount Lemmon Survey ||  || align=right data-sort-value="0.64" | 640 m || 
|-id=588 bgcolor=#fefefe
| 555588 ||  || — || September 29, 2005 || Kitt Peak || Spacewatch ||  || align=right data-sort-value="0.80" | 800 m || 
|-id=589 bgcolor=#d6d6d6
| 555589 ||  || — || January 5, 2014 || Haleakala || Pan-STARRS ||  || align=right | 2.4 km || 
|-id=590 bgcolor=#d6d6d6
| 555590 ||  || — || January 1, 2014 || Haleakala || Pan-STARRS ||  || align=right | 2.0 km || 
|-id=591 bgcolor=#C2E0FF
| 555591 ||  || — || February 12, 2013 || Haleakala || Pan-STARRS || other TNOcritical || align=right | 147 km || 
|-id=592 bgcolor=#E9E9E9
| 555592 ||  || — || May 12, 2015 || Mount Lemmon || Mount Lemmon Survey ||  || align=right data-sort-value="0.65" | 650 m || 
|-id=593 bgcolor=#d6d6d6
| 555593 ||  || — || January 1, 2014 || Kitt Peak || Spacewatch || 7:4 || align=right | 2.8 km || 
|-id=594 bgcolor=#d6d6d6
| 555594 ||  || — || January 5, 2014 || Haleakala || Pan-STARRS ||  || align=right | 2.7 km || 
|-id=595 bgcolor=#fefefe
| 555595 ||  || — || October 26, 2016 || Mount Lemmon || Mount Lemmon Survey ||  || align=right data-sort-value="0.81" | 810 m || 
|-id=596 bgcolor=#d6d6d6
| 555596 ||  || — || May 1, 2016 || Haleakala || Pan-STARRS ||  || align=right | 2.1 km || 
|-id=597 bgcolor=#d6d6d6
| 555597 ||  || — || July 5, 2016 || Mount Lemmon || Mount Lemmon Survey ||  || align=right | 2.6 km || 
|-id=598 bgcolor=#d6d6d6
| 555598 ||  || — || June 24, 2017 || Haleakala || Pan-STARRS ||  || align=right | 2.3 km || 
|-id=599 bgcolor=#fefefe
| 555599 ||  || — || January 10, 2014 || Kitt Peak || Spacewatch ||  || align=right data-sort-value="0.52" | 520 m || 
|-id=600 bgcolor=#d6d6d6
| 555600 ||  || — || January 3, 2014 || Mount Lemmon || Mount Lemmon Survey ||  || align=right | 2.5 km || 
|}

555601–555700 

|-bgcolor=#d6d6d6
| 555601 ||  || — || January 1, 2014 || Haleakala || Pan-STARRS ||  || align=right | 3.1 km || 
|-id=602 bgcolor=#d6d6d6
| 555602 ||  || — || January 7, 2014 || Mount Lemmon || Mount Lemmon Survey ||  || align=right | 2.5 km || 
|-id=603 bgcolor=#d6d6d6
| 555603 ||  || — || January 1, 2014 || Mount Lemmon || Mount Lemmon Survey ||  || align=right | 2.8 km || 
|-id=604 bgcolor=#fefefe
| 555604 ||  || — || December 14, 2013 || Mount Lemmon || Mount Lemmon Survey ||  || align=right data-sort-value="0.74" | 740 m || 
|-id=605 bgcolor=#fefefe
| 555605 ||  || — || December 28, 2013 || Kitt Peak || Spacewatch ||  || align=right data-sort-value="0.58" | 580 m || 
|-id=606 bgcolor=#fefefe
| 555606 ||  || — || April 29, 2008 || Mount Lemmon || Mount Lemmon Survey ||  || align=right data-sort-value="0.51" | 510 m || 
|-id=607 bgcolor=#fefefe
| 555607 ||  || — || December 21, 2006 || Kitt Peak || Spacewatch ||  || align=right data-sort-value="0.57" | 570 m || 
|-id=608 bgcolor=#d6d6d6
| 555608 ||  || — || January 7, 2014 || Mount Lemmon || Mount Lemmon Survey ||  || align=right | 2.8 km || 
|-id=609 bgcolor=#E9E9E9
| 555609 ||  || — || January 2, 2009 || Mount Lemmon || Mount Lemmon Survey ||  || align=right | 2.2 km || 
|-id=610 bgcolor=#fefefe
| 555610 ||  || — || October 3, 2006 || Mount Lemmon || Mount Lemmon Survey ||  || align=right data-sort-value="0.62" | 620 m || 
|-id=611 bgcolor=#d6d6d6
| 555611 ||  || — || January 1, 2014 || Haleakala || Pan-STARRS ||  || align=right | 3.3 km || 
|-id=612 bgcolor=#fefefe
| 555612 ||  || — || March 2, 2011 || Kitt Peak || Spacewatch ||  || align=right data-sort-value="0.50" | 500 m || 
|-id=613 bgcolor=#fefefe
| 555613 ||  || — || December 12, 2006 || Marly || P. Kocher ||  || align=right data-sort-value="0.76" | 760 m || 
|-id=614 bgcolor=#d6d6d6
| 555614 ||  || — || January 31, 2009 || Mount Lemmon || Mount Lemmon Survey ||  || align=right | 3.0 km || 
|-id=615 bgcolor=#fefefe
| 555615 ||  || — || January 16, 2004 || Kitt Peak || Spacewatch ||  || align=right data-sort-value="0.61" | 610 m || 
|-id=616 bgcolor=#d6d6d6
| 555616 ||  || — || February 24, 2009 || Kitt Peak || Spacewatch ||  || align=right | 2.4 km || 
|-id=617 bgcolor=#d6d6d6
| 555617 ||  || — || January 28, 2003 || Socorro || LINEAR ||  || align=right | 3.7 km || 
|-id=618 bgcolor=#d6d6d6
| 555618 ||  || — || January 23, 2014 || Mount Lemmon || Mount Lemmon Survey ||  || align=right | 2.3 km || 
|-id=619 bgcolor=#d6d6d6
| 555619 ||  || — || August 23, 2006 || Palomar || NEAT ||  || align=right | 3.5 km || 
|-id=620 bgcolor=#d6d6d6
| 555620 ||  || — || September 19, 2001 || Apache Point || SDSS Collaboration || EOS || align=right | 2.2 km || 
|-id=621 bgcolor=#d6d6d6
| 555621 ||  || — || October 15, 2001 || Palomar || NEAT ||  || align=right | 3.6 km || 
|-id=622 bgcolor=#fefefe
| 555622 ||  || — || January 21, 2014 || Kitt Peak || Spacewatch ||  || align=right data-sort-value="0.62" | 620 m || 
|-id=623 bgcolor=#fefefe
| 555623 ||  || — || March 26, 2011 || Kitt Peak || Spacewatch ||  || align=right data-sort-value="0.79" | 790 m || 
|-id=624 bgcolor=#fefefe
| 555624 ||  || — || February 21, 2007 || Nyukasa || H. Kurosaki, A. Nakajima ||  || align=right data-sort-value="0.83" | 830 m || 
|-id=625 bgcolor=#fefefe
| 555625 ||  || — || August 6, 2005 || Palomar || NEAT ||  || align=right | 1.0 km || 
|-id=626 bgcolor=#d6d6d6
| 555626 ||  || — || December 18, 2007 || Bergisch Gladbach || W. Bickel ||  || align=right | 2.7 km || 
|-id=627 bgcolor=#fefefe
| 555627 ||  || — || November 11, 2006 || Kitt Peak || Spacewatch ||  || align=right data-sort-value="0.62" | 620 m || 
|-id=628 bgcolor=#d6d6d6
| 555628 ||  || — || January 26, 2014 || Haleakala || Pan-STARRS || Tj (2.99) || align=right | 2.8 km || 
|-id=629 bgcolor=#E9E9E9
| 555629 ||  || — || October 19, 2003 || Socorro || LINEAR ||  || align=right | 2.5 km || 
|-id=630 bgcolor=#fefefe
| 555630 ||  || — || January 18, 2004 || Palomar || NEAT ||  || align=right data-sort-value="0.76" | 760 m || 
|-id=631 bgcolor=#d6d6d6
| 555631 ||  || — || January 11, 2014 || Kitt Peak || Spacewatch ||  || align=right | 2.8 km || 
|-id=632 bgcolor=#C2E0FF
| 555632 ||  || — || January 24, 2014 || La Silla || D. L. Rabinowitz || other TNO || align=right | 445 km || 
|-id=633 bgcolor=#fefefe
| 555633 ||  || — || October 27, 2006 || Catalina || CSS ||  || align=right data-sort-value="0.62" | 620 m || 
|-id=634 bgcolor=#fefefe
| 555634 ||  || — || May 2, 2008 || Catalina || CSS ||  || align=right data-sort-value="0.79" | 790 m || 
|-id=635 bgcolor=#d6d6d6
| 555635 ||  || — || January 11, 2008 || Mount Lemmon || Mount Lemmon Survey ||  || align=right | 2.4 km || 
|-id=636 bgcolor=#d6d6d6
| 555636 ||  || — || March 8, 2003 || Anderson Mesa || LONEOS ||  || align=right | 4.1 km || 
|-id=637 bgcolor=#fefefe
| 555637 ||  || — || October 26, 2009 || Kitt Peak || Spacewatch ||  || align=right data-sort-value="0.65" | 650 m || 
|-id=638 bgcolor=#d6d6d6
| 555638 ||  || — || January 15, 2008 || Kitt Peak || Spacewatch ||  || align=right | 2.8 km || 
|-id=639 bgcolor=#E9E9E9
| 555639 ||  || — || January 21, 2014 || Mount Lemmon || Mount Lemmon Survey ||  || align=right | 1.6 km || 
|-id=640 bgcolor=#d6d6d6
| 555640 ||  || — || May 15, 2009 || Mount Lemmon || Mount Lemmon Survey ||  || align=right | 2.9 km || 
|-id=641 bgcolor=#d6d6d6
| 555641 ||  || — || July 18, 2012 || Siding Spring || SSS ||  || align=right | 2.4 km || 
|-id=642 bgcolor=#d6d6d6
| 555642 ||  || — || January 21, 2015 || Haleakala || Pan-STARRS ||  || align=right | 2.2 km || 
|-id=643 bgcolor=#d6d6d6
| 555643 ||  || — || March 17, 2015 || Haleakala || Pan-STARRS ||  || align=right | 3.0 km || 
|-id=644 bgcolor=#d6d6d6
| 555644 ||  || — || July 25, 2017 || Haleakala || Pan-STARRS ||  || align=right | 2.1 km || 
|-id=645 bgcolor=#d6d6d6
| 555645 ||  || — || January 24, 2014 || Haleakala || Pan-STARRS ||  || align=right | 2.9 km || 
|-id=646 bgcolor=#d6d6d6
| 555646 ||  || — || January 24, 2014 || Haleakala || Pan-STARRS ||  || align=right | 2.1 km || 
|-id=647 bgcolor=#fefefe
| 555647 ||  || — || January 28, 2014 || Kitt Peak || Spacewatch ||  || align=right data-sort-value="0.49" | 490 m || 
|-id=648 bgcolor=#d6d6d6
| 555648 ||  || — || January 21, 2014 || Kitt Peak || Spacewatch ||  || align=right | 1.9 km || 
|-id=649 bgcolor=#fefefe
| 555649 ||  || — || January 28, 2014 || Mount Lemmon || Mount Lemmon Survey ||  || align=right data-sort-value="0.57" | 570 m || 
|-id=650 bgcolor=#d6d6d6
| 555650 ||  || — || January 28, 2014 || Mount Lemmon || Mount Lemmon Survey ||  || align=right | 2.3 km || 
|-id=651 bgcolor=#d6d6d6
| 555651 ||  || — || January 29, 2014 || Kitt Peak || Spacewatch ||  || align=right | 2.5 km || 
|-id=652 bgcolor=#fefefe
| 555652 ||  || — || January 24, 2014 || Haleakala || Pan-STARRS ||  || align=right data-sort-value="0.51" | 510 m || 
|-id=653 bgcolor=#d6d6d6
| 555653 ||  || — || February 2, 2014 || Catalina || CSS ||  || align=right | 3.3 km || 
|-id=654 bgcolor=#d6d6d6
| 555654 ||  || — || March 30, 2003 || Kitt Peak || M. W. Buie, A. B. Jordan ||  || align=right | 2.9 km || 
|-id=655 bgcolor=#d6d6d6
| 555655 ||  || — || December 11, 2013 || Mount Lemmon || Mount Lemmon Survey ||  || align=right | 3.1 km || 
|-id=656 bgcolor=#fefefe
| 555656 ||  || — || September 28, 2009 || Mount Lemmon || Mount Lemmon Survey ||  || align=right data-sort-value="0.60" | 600 m || 
|-id=657 bgcolor=#fefefe
| 555657 ||  || — || July 5, 2005 || Mount Lemmon || Mount Lemmon Survey ||  || align=right | 1.0 km || 
|-id=658 bgcolor=#fefefe
| 555658 ||  || — || August 16, 2009 || Kitt Peak || Spacewatch ||  || align=right data-sort-value="0.60" | 600 m || 
|-id=659 bgcolor=#fefefe
| 555659 ||  || — || March 30, 2011 || Mount Lemmon || Mount Lemmon Survey ||  || align=right data-sort-value="0.68" | 680 m || 
|-id=660 bgcolor=#fefefe
| 555660 ||  || — || March 12, 2011 || Mount Lemmon || Mount Lemmon Survey ||  || align=right data-sort-value="0.66" | 660 m || 
|-id=661 bgcolor=#E9E9E9
| 555661 ||  || — || January 24, 2014 || Haleakala || Pan-STARRS ||  || align=right | 1.6 km || 
|-id=662 bgcolor=#E9E9E9
| 555662 ||  || — || November 20, 2008 || Kitt Peak || Spacewatch ||  || align=right | 1.4 km || 
|-id=663 bgcolor=#d6d6d6
| 555663 ||  || — || October 15, 2001 || Palomar || NEAT ||  || align=right | 2.9 km || 
|-id=664 bgcolor=#d6d6d6
| 555664 ||  || — || January 3, 2014 || Kitt Peak || Spacewatch ||  || align=right | 2.7 km || 
|-id=665 bgcolor=#d6d6d6
| 555665 ||  || — || December 5, 2007 || Mount Lemmon || Mount Lemmon Survey ||  || align=right | 2.5 km || 
|-id=666 bgcolor=#fefefe
| 555666 ||  || — || April 26, 2004 || Kitt Peak || Spacewatch ||  || align=right data-sort-value="0.76" | 760 m || 
|-id=667 bgcolor=#d6d6d6
| 555667 ||  || — || December 25, 2013 || Mount Lemmon || Mount Lemmon Survey ||  || align=right | 3.7 km || 
|-id=668 bgcolor=#fefefe
| 555668 ||  || — || October 22, 2006 || Mount Lemmon || Mount Lemmon Survey ||  || align=right data-sort-value="0.76" | 760 m || 
|-id=669 bgcolor=#d6d6d6
| 555669 ||  || — || November 11, 2001 || Apache Point || SDSS Collaboration ||  || align=right | 3.0 km || 
|-id=670 bgcolor=#FA8072
| 555670 ||  || — || September 20, 2009 || Catalina || CSS ||  || align=right | 1.0 km || 
|-id=671 bgcolor=#fefefe
| 555671 ||  || — || February 20, 2003 || Haleakala || AMOS ||  || align=right data-sort-value="0.87" | 870 m || 
|-id=672 bgcolor=#fefefe
| 555672 ||  || — || March 12, 2007 || Kitt Peak || Spacewatch ||  || align=right data-sort-value="0.63" | 630 m || 
|-id=673 bgcolor=#fefefe
| 555673 ||  || — || February 2, 2003 || Palomar || NEAT ||  || align=right data-sort-value="0.93" | 930 m || 
|-id=674 bgcolor=#fefefe
| 555674 ||  || — || February 17, 2007 || Kitt Peak || Spacewatch ||  || align=right data-sort-value="0.60" | 600 m || 
|-id=675 bgcolor=#fefefe
| 555675 ||  || — || November 22, 2006 || Kitt Peak || Spacewatch ||  || align=right data-sort-value="0.67" | 670 m || 
|-id=676 bgcolor=#d6d6d6
| 555676 ||  || — || February 22, 2003 || Palomar || NEAT ||  || align=right | 3.0 km || 
|-id=677 bgcolor=#fefefe
| 555677 ||  || — || February 16, 2004 || Kitt Peak || Spacewatch ||  || align=right data-sort-value="0.84" | 840 m || 
|-id=678 bgcolor=#C2E0FF
| 555678 ||  || — || April 2, 2011 || Haleakala || Pan-STARRS || cubewano? || align=right | 377 km || 
|-id=679 bgcolor=#fefefe
| 555679 ||  || — || February 6, 2014 || Mount Lemmon || Mount Lemmon Survey ||  || align=right data-sort-value="0.66" | 660 m || 
|-id=680 bgcolor=#fefefe
| 555680 ||  || — || May 8, 2008 || Kitt Peak || Spacewatch ||  || align=right data-sort-value="0.81" | 810 m || 
|-id=681 bgcolor=#fefefe
| 555681 ||  || — || October 21, 2006 || Mount Lemmon || Mount Lemmon Survey ||  || align=right data-sort-value="0.60" | 600 m || 
|-id=682 bgcolor=#d6d6d6
| 555682 ||  || — || October 15, 2001 || Palomar || NEAT ||  || align=right | 3.4 km || 
|-id=683 bgcolor=#d6d6d6
| 555683 ||  || — || January 9, 2014 || Mount Lemmon || Mount Lemmon Survey ||  || align=right | 2.6 km || 
|-id=684 bgcolor=#fefefe
| 555684 ||  || — || September 28, 2009 || Mount Lemmon || Mount Lemmon Survey ||  || align=right data-sort-value="0.74" | 740 m || 
|-id=685 bgcolor=#d6d6d6
| 555685 ||  || — || May 1, 2009 || Mount Lemmon || Mount Lemmon Survey ||  || align=right | 2.3 km || 
|-id=686 bgcolor=#fefefe
| 555686 ||  || — || May 26, 2011 || Kitt Peak || Mount Lemmon Survey ||  || align=right data-sort-value="0.56" | 560 m || 
|-id=687 bgcolor=#E9E9E9
| 555687 ||  || — || January 3, 2014 || Mount Lemmon || Mount Lemmon Survey ||  || align=right | 1.6 km || 
|-id=688 bgcolor=#fefefe
| 555688 ||  || — || October 9, 2012 || Haleakala || Pan-STARRS ||  || align=right data-sort-value="0.69" | 690 m || 
|-id=689 bgcolor=#fefefe
| 555689 ||  || — || March 26, 2007 || Kitt Peak || Spacewatch ||  || align=right data-sort-value="0.64" | 640 m || 
|-id=690 bgcolor=#fefefe
| 555690 ||  || — || March 15, 2007 || Catalina || CSS ||  || align=right data-sort-value="0.95" | 950 m || 
|-id=691 bgcolor=#d6d6d6
| 555691 ||  || — || February 1, 2003 || Kitt Peak || Spacewatch ||  || align=right | 3.5 km || 
|-id=692 bgcolor=#d6d6d6
| 555692 ||  || — || October 8, 2002 || Palomar || NEAT ||  || align=right | 3.3 km || 
|-id=693 bgcolor=#fefefe
| 555693 ||  || — || December 27, 2006 || Mount Lemmon || Mount Lemmon Survey || V || align=right data-sort-value="0.65" | 650 m || 
|-id=694 bgcolor=#fefefe
| 555694 ||  || — || December 1, 2006 || Kitt Peak || Spacewatch ||  || align=right data-sort-value="0.59" | 590 m || 
|-id=695 bgcolor=#fefefe
| 555695 ||  || — || August 9, 2005 || Cerro Tololo || Cerro Tololo Obs. ||  || align=right data-sort-value="0.70" | 700 m || 
|-id=696 bgcolor=#d6d6d6
| 555696 ||  || — || January 29, 2014 || Kitt Peak || Spacewatch ||  || align=right | 2.4 km || 
|-id=697 bgcolor=#fefefe
| 555697 ||  || — || January 17, 2007 || Kitt Peak || Spacewatch ||  || align=right data-sort-value="0.56" | 560 m || 
|-id=698 bgcolor=#fefefe
| 555698 ||  || — || February 22, 2014 || Kitt Peak || Spacewatch ||  || align=right data-sort-value="0.70" | 700 m || 
|-id=699 bgcolor=#d6d6d6
| 555699 ||  || — || January 16, 2008 || Kitt Peak || Spacewatch ||  || align=right | 3.2 km || 
|-id=700 bgcolor=#fefefe
| 555700 ||  || — || February 9, 2014 || Kitt Peak || Spacewatch ||  || align=right data-sort-value="0.73" | 730 m || 
|}

555701–555800 

|-bgcolor=#fefefe
| 555701 ||  || — || December 27, 2006 || Mount Lemmon || Mount Lemmon Survey ||  || align=right data-sort-value="0.56" | 560 m || 
|-id=702 bgcolor=#fefefe
| 555702 ||  || — || September 6, 2008 || Mount Lemmon || Mount Lemmon Survey ||  || align=right data-sort-value="0.70" | 700 m || 
|-id=703 bgcolor=#fefefe
| 555703 ||  || — || January 24, 2007 || Mount Lemmon || Mount Lemmon Survey ||  || align=right data-sort-value="0.69" | 690 m || 
|-id=704 bgcolor=#E9E9E9
| 555704 ||  || — || December 20, 2004 || Mount Lemmon || Mount Lemmon Survey ||  || align=right | 1.4 km || 
|-id=705 bgcolor=#fefefe
| 555705 ||  || — || February 14, 2010 || Cerro Tololo || CSS || V || align=right data-sort-value="0.82" | 820 m || 
|-id=706 bgcolor=#fefefe
| 555706 ||  || — || February 26, 2014 || Kitt Peak || Pan-STARRS ||  || align=right data-sort-value="0.66" | 660 m || 
|-id=707 bgcolor=#fefefe
| 555707 ||  || — || May 24, 2011 || Mount Lemmon || Mount Lemmon Survey ||  || align=right data-sort-value="0.61" | 610 m || 
|-id=708 bgcolor=#fefefe
| 555708 ||  || — || January 17, 2007 || Kitt Peak || Spacewatch ||  || align=right data-sort-value="0.57" | 570 m || 
|-id=709 bgcolor=#fefefe
| 555709 ||  || — || November 11, 2009 || Kitt Peak || Spacewatch ||  || align=right data-sort-value="0.49" | 490 m || 
|-id=710 bgcolor=#fefefe
| 555710 ||  || — || January 28, 2007 || Kitt Peak || Spacewatch ||  || align=right data-sort-value="0.75" | 750 m || 
|-id=711 bgcolor=#fefefe
| 555711 ||  || — || December 5, 2002 || Socorro || LINEAR ||  || align=right data-sort-value="0.75" | 750 m || 
|-id=712 bgcolor=#fefefe
| 555712 ||  || — || November 12, 2012 || Mount Lemmon || Mount Lemmon Survey ||  || align=right data-sort-value="0.77" | 770 m || 
|-id=713 bgcolor=#fefefe
| 555713 ||  || — || October 26, 2005 || Kitt Peak || Spacewatch ||  || align=right data-sort-value="0.74" | 740 m || 
|-id=714 bgcolor=#fefefe
| 555714 ||  || — || February 26, 2014 || Haleakala || Pan-STARRS ||  || align=right data-sort-value="0.69" | 690 m || 
|-id=715 bgcolor=#fefefe
| 555715 ||  || — || February 26, 2014 || Haleakala || Pan-STARRS ||  || align=right data-sort-value="0.62" | 620 m || 
|-id=716 bgcolor=#fefefe
| 555716 ||  || — || March 10, 2007 || Kitt Peak || Spacewatch ||  || align=right data-sort-value="0.66" | 660 m || 
|-id=717 bgcolor=#fefefe
| 555717 ||  || — || March 11, 2007 || Kitt Peak || Spacewatch ||  || align=right data-sort-value="0.62" | 620 m || 
|-id=718 bgcolor=#fefefe
| 555718 ||  || — || February 26, 2014 || Haleakala || Pan-STARRS ||  || align=right data-sort-value="0.70" | 700 m || 
|-id=719 bgcolor=#fefefe
| 555719 ||  || — || May 24, 2011 || Mount Lemmon || Mount Lemmon Survey ||  || align=right data-sort-value="0.65" | 650 m || 
|-id=720 bgcolor=#fefefe
| 555720 ||  || — || February 10, 2014 || Haleakala || Pan-STARRS ||  || align=right data-sort-value="0.91" | 910 m || 
|-id=721 bgcolor=#fefefe
| 555721 ||  || — || May 24, 2011 || Mount Lemmon || Mount Lemmon Survey ||  || align=right data-sort-value="0.62" | 620 m || 
|-id=722 bgcolor=#fefefe
| 555722 ||  || — || October 25, 2001 || Apache Point || SDSS Collaboration ||  || align=right data-sort-value="0.91" | 910 m || 
|-id=723 bgcolor=#fefefe
| 555723 ||  || — || February 26, 2014 || Haleakala || Pan-STARRS ||  || align=right data-sort-value="0.62" | 620 m || 
|-id=724 bgcolor=#fefefe
| 555724 ||  || — || September 22, 1995 || Kitt Peak || Spacewatch ||  || align=right data-sort-value="0.52" | 520 m || 
|-id=725 bgcolor=#fefefe
| 555725 ||  || — || February 4, 2014 || Mount Lemmon || Mount Lemmon Survey ||  || align=right data-sort-value="0.94" | 940 m || 
|-id=726 bgcolor=#fefefe
| 555726 ||  || — || February 26, 2014 || Haleakala || Pan-STARRS ||  || align=right data-sort-value="0.64" | 640 m || 
|-id=727 bgcolor=#fefefe
| 555727 ||  || — || February 25, 2007 || Kitt Peak || Spacewatch ||  || align=right data-sort-value="0.71" | 710 m || 
|-id=728 bgcolor=#fefefe
| 555728 ||  || — || February 22, 2014 || Mount Lemmon || Mount Lemmon Survey ||  || align=right data-sort-value="0.52" | 520 m || 
|-id=729 bgcolor=#fefefe
| 555729 ||  || — || January 10, 2007 || Kitt Peak || Spacewatch ||  || align=right data-sort-value="0.58" | 580 m || 
|-id=730 bgcolor=#fefefe
| 555730 ||  || — || February 9, 2014 || Haleakala || Pan-STARRS ||  || align=right data-sort-value="0.52" | 520 m || 
|-id=731 bgcolor=#d6d6d6
| 555731 ||  || — || January 12, 2008 || Mount Lemmon || Mount Lemmon Survey ||  || align=right | 2.9 km || 
|-id=732 bgcolor=#fefefe
| 555732 ||  || — || August 26, 2012 || Haleakala || Pan-STARRS ||  || align=right data-sort-value="0.60" | 600 m || 
|-id=733 bgcolor=#d6d6d6
| 555733 ||  || — || February 26, 2014 || Haleakala || Pan-STARRS ||  || align=right | 2.4 km || 
|-id=734 bgcolor=#fefefe
| 555734 ||  || — || October 24, 2009 || Kitt Peak || Spacewatch ||  || align=right data-sort-value="0.56" | 560 m || 
|-id=735 bgcolor=#fefefe
| 555735 ||  || — || December 20, 2009 || Mount Lemmon || Mount Lemmon Survey ||  || align=right data-sort-value="0.76" | 760 m || 
|-id=736 bgcolor=#fefefe
| 555736 ||  || — || September 18, 2009 || Mount Lemmon || Mount Lemmon Survey ||  || align=right data-sort-value="0.59" | 590 m || 
|-id=737 bgcolor=#fefefe
| 555737 ||  || — || January 28, 2014 || Kitt Peak || Spacewatch ||  || align=right data-sort-value="0.56" | 560 m || 
|-id=738 bgcolor=#d6d6d6
| 555738 ||  || — || January 15, 2008 || Kitt Peak || Mount Lemmon Survey ||  || align=right | 3.3 km || 
|-id=739 bgcolor=#fefefe
| 555739 ||  || — || April 13, 2011 || Kitt Peak || Spacewatch ||  || align=right data-sort-value="0.53" | 530 m || 
|-id=740 bgcolor=#d6d6d6
| 555740 ||  || — || January 10, 2014 || Mount Lemmon || Mount Lemmon Survey ||  || align=right | 2.5 km || 
|-id=741 bgcolor=#fefefe
| 555741 ||  || — || August 10, 2012 || Kitt Peak || Spacewatch ||  || align=right data-sort-value="0.63" | 630 m || 
|-id=742 bgcolor=#fefefe
| 555742 ||  || — || May 3, 2008 || Mount Lemmon || Mount Lemmon Survey ||  || align=right data-sort-value="0.52" | 520 m || 
|-id=743 bgcolor=#fefefe
| 555743 ||  || — || March 16, 2007 || Mount Lemmon || Mount Lemmon Survey ||  || align=right data-sort-value="0.50" | 500 m || 
|-id=744 bgcolor=#fefefe
| 555744 ||  || — || October 12, 2005 || Kitt Peak || Spacewatch ||  || align=right data-sort-value="0.85" | 850 m || 
|-id=745 bgcolor=#d6d6d6
| 555745 ||  || — || February 26, 2014 || Haleakala || Pan-STARRS ||  || align=right | 2.3 km || 
|-id=746 bgcolor=#d6d6d6
| 555746 ||  || — || October 18, 2001 || Palomar || NEAT ||  || align=right | 3.3 km || 
|-id=747 bgcolor=#fefefe
| 555747 ||  || — || September 16, 2009 || Mount Lemmon || Mount Lemmon Survey ||  || align=right data-sort-value="0.63" | 630 m || 
|-id=748 bgcolor=#fefefe
| 555748 ||  || — || August 19, 2001 || Cerro Tololo || Cerro Tololo Obs. ||  || align=right data-sort-value="0.56" | 560 m || 
|-id=749 bgcolor=#fefefe
| 555749 ||  || — || December 6, 2012 || Mount Lemmon || Mount Lemmon Survey ||  || align=right data-sort-value="0.64" | 640 m || 
|-id=750 bgcolor=#d6d6d6
| 555750 ||  || — || August 23, 2004 || Kitt Peak || Spacewatch || 7:4 || align=right | 3.2 km || 
|-id=751 bgcolor=#fefefe
| 555751 ||  || — || February 22, 2014 || Kitt Peak || Spacewatch ||  || align=right data-sort-value="0.50" | 500 m || 
|-id=752 bgcolor=#fefefe
| 555752 ||  || — || December 16, 2006 || Mount Lemmon || Mount Lemmon Survey ||  || align=right data-sort-value="0.60" | 600 m || 
|-id=753 bgcolor=#fefefe
| 555753 ||  || — || February 22, 2014 || Kitt Peak || Spacewatch ||  || align=right data-sort-value="0.72" | 720 m || 
|-id=754 bgcolor=#fefefe
| 555754 ||  || — || December 21, 2006 || Mount Lemmon || Mount Lemmon Survey ||  || align=right data-sort-value="0.55" | 550 m || 
|-id=755 bgcolor=#fefefe
| 555755 ||  || — || December 18, 2006 || Socorro || LINEAR ||  || align=right data-sort-value="0.73" | 730 m || 
|-id=756 bgcolor=#C2E0FF
| 555756 ||  || — || February 26, 2014 || Haleakala || Pan-STARRS || res3:4critical || align=right | 191 km || 
|-id=757 bgcolor=#C2E0FF
| 555757 ||  || — || February 26, 2014 || Haleakala || Pan-STARRS || cubewano (hot)critical || align=right | 324 km || 
|-id=758 bgcolor=#C2E0FF
| 555758 ||  || — || February 25, 2014 || Haleakala || Pan-STARRS || plutinocritical || align=right | 129 km || 
|-id=759 bgcolor=#fefefe
| 555759 ||  || — || February 26, 2014 || Haleakala || Pan-STARRS ||  || align=right data-sort-value="0.55" | 550 m || 
|-id=760 bgcolor=#fefefe
| 555760 ||  || — || November 7, 2008 || Mount Lemmon || Mount Lemmon Survey ||  || align=right | 1.0 km || 
|-id=761 bgcolor=#fefefe
| 555761 ||  || — || October 14, 2012 || Mount Lemmon || Mount Lemmon Survey ||  || align=right data-sort-value="0.68" | 680 m || 
|-id=762 bgcolor=#fefefe
| 555762 ||  || — || September 7, 2008 || Mount Lemmon || Mount Lemmon Survey ||  || align=right data-sort-value="0.91" | 910 m || 
|-id=763 bgcolor=#fefefe
| 555763 ||  || — || October 17, 2012 || Haleakala || Pan-STARRS ||  || align=right data-sort-value="0.67" | 670 m || 
|-id=764 bgcolor=#fefefe
| 555764 ||  || — || October 11, 2005 || Kitt Peak || Spacewatch ||  || align=right data-sort-value="0.68" | 680 m || 
|-id=765 bgcolor=#fefefe
| 555765 ||  || — || December 1, 2005 || Kitt Peak || Spacewatch ||  || align=right data-sort-value="0.71" | 710 m || 
|-id=766 bgcolor=#fefefe
| 555766 ||  || — || February 26, 2014 || Haleakala || Pan-STARRS ||  || align=right data-sort-value="0.58" | 580 m || 
|-id=767 bgcolor=#fefefe
| 555767 ||  || — || February 27, 2014 || Haleakala || Pan-STARRS ||  || align=right | 1.0 km || 
|-id=768 bgcolor=#d6d6d6
| 555768 ||  || — || July 4, 2016 || Catalina || Pan-STARRS ||  || align=right | 3.6 km || 
|-id=769 bgcolor=#fefefe
| 555769 ||  || — || February 27, 2014 || Haleakala || Pan-STARRS ||  || align=right data-sort-value="0.98" | 980 m || 
|-id=770 bgcolor=#fefefe
| 555770 ||  || — || August 26, 2012 || Haleakala || Pan-STARRS ||  || align=right data-sort-value="0.54" | 540 m || 
|-id=771 bgcolor=#fefefe
| 555771 ||  || — || November 23, 2009 || Kitt Peak || Spacewatch ||  || align=right data-sort-value="0.52" | 520 m || 
|-id=772 bgcolor=#d6d6d6
| 555772 ||  || — || April 1, 2003 || Apache Point || SDSS Collaboration ||  || align=right | 2.6 km || 
|-id=773 bgcolor=#fefefe
| 555773 ||  || — || February 18, 2014 || Mount Lemmon || Mount Lemmon Survey ||  || align=right data-sort-value="0.63" | 630 m || 
|-id=774 bgcolor=#fefefe
| 555774 ||  || — || February 26, 2014 || Haleakala || Pan-STARRS ||  || align=right data-sort-value="0.51" | 510 m || 
|-id=775 bgcolor=#d6d6d6
| 555775 ||  || — || February 26, 2014 || Haleakala || Pan-STARRS || 7:4 || align=right | 3.4 km || 
|-id=776 bgcolor=#E9E9E9
| 555776 ||  || — || February 27, 2014 || Haleakala || Pan-STARRS ||  || align=right | 1.6 km || 
|-id=777 bgcolor=#E9E9E9
| 555777 ||  || — || February 26, 2014 || Mount Lemmon || Mount Lemmon Survey ||  || align=right data-sort-value="0.80" | 800 m || 
|-id=778 bgcolor=#fefefe
| 555778 ||  || — || March 23, 2003 || Apache Point || SDSS Collaboration ||  || align=right data-sort-value="0.58" | 580 m || 
|-id=779 bgcolor=#fefefe
| 555779 ||  || — || February 25, 2014 || Haleakala || Pan-STARRS ||  || align=right data-sort-value="0.98" | 980 m || 
|-id=780 bgcolor=#fefefe
| 555780 ||  || — || February 28, 2014 || Haleakala || Pan-STARRS ||  || align=right data-sort-value="0.61" | 610 m || 
|-id=781 bgcolor=#d6d6d6
| 555781 ||  || — || January 7, 2014 || Kitt Peak || Spacewatch ||  || align=right | 2.3 km || 
|-id=782 bgcolor=#fefefe
| 555782 ||  || — || February 21, 2007 || Kitt Peak || Spacewatch ||  || align=right data-sort-value="0.50" | 500 m || 
|-id=783 bgcolor=#fefefe
| 555783 ||  || — || January 28, 2007 || Kitt Peak || Spacewatch ||  || align=right data-sort-value="0.69" | 690 m || 
|-id=784 bgcolor=#fefefe
| 555784 ||  || — || March 5, 2014 || Haleakala || Pan-STARRS ||  || align=right data-sort-value="0.64" | 640 m || 
|-id=785 bgcolor=#fefefe
| 555785 ||  || — || January 27, 2007 || Kitt Peak || Spacewatch ||  || align=right data-sort-value="0.57" | 570 m || 
|-id=786 bgcolor=#fefefe
| 555786 ||  || — || February 14, 2000 || Kitt Peak || Spacewatch ||  || align=right data-sort-value="0.58" | 580 m || 
|-id=787 bgcolor=#fefefe
| 555787 ||  || — || February 28, 2014 || Haleakala || Pan-STARRS ||  || align=right data-sort-value="0.55" | 550 m || 
|-id=788 bgcolor=#fefefe
| 555788 ||  || — || February 27, 2007 || Kitt Peak || Spacewatch ||  || align=right | 1.00 km || 
|-id=789 bgcolor=#fefefe
| 555789 ||  || — || December 14, 2013 || Haleakala || Pan-STARRS ||  || align=right data-sort-value="0.97" | 970 m || 
|-id=790 bgcolor=#fefefe
| 555790 ||  || — || May 10, 2004 || Kitt Peak || Spacewatch ||  || align=right data-sort-value="0.63" | 630 m || 
|-id=791 bgcolor=#fefefe
| 555791 ||  || — || September 3, 2008 || La Sagra || OAM Obs. ||  || align=right data-sort-value="0.89" | 890 m || 
|-id=792 bgcolor=#fefefe
| 555792 ||  || — || May 24, 2011 || Mount Lemmon || Mount Lemmon Survey ||  || align=right data-sort-value="0.60" | 600 m || 
|-id=793 bgcolor=#fefefe
| 555793 ||  || — || April 16, 2004 || Kitt Peak || Spacewatch ||  || align=right data-sort-value="0.87" | 870 m || 
|-id=794 bgcolor=#fefefe
| 555794 ||  || — || April 2, 2011 || Kitt Peak || Spacewatch ||  || align=right data-sort-value="0.64" | 640 m || 
|-id=795 bgcolor=#fefefe
| 555795 ||  || — || February 27, 2014 || Kitt Peak || Spacewatch ||  || align=right data-sort-value="0.71" | 710 m || 
|-id=796 bgcolor=#fefefe
| 555796 ||  || — || February 21, 2007 || Mount Lemmon || Mount Lemmon Survey ||  || align=right data-sort-value="0.60" | 600 m || 
|-id=797 bgcolor=#fefefe
| 555797 ||  || — || December 14, 2013 || Haleakala || Pan-STARRS || PHO || align=right data-sort-value="0.91" | 910 m || 
|-id=798 bgcolor=#d6d6d6
| 555798 ||  || — || February 9, 2008 || Kitt Peak || Spacewatch || (1298) || align=right | 2.5 km || 
|-id=799 bgcolor=#fefefe
| 555799 ||  || — || November 19, 2009 || Kitt Peak || Spacewatch ||  || align=right data-sort-value="0.66" | 660 m || 
|-id=800 bgcolor=#fefefe
| 555800 ||  || — || March 16, 2007 || Catalina || CSS ||  || align=right data-sort-value="0.78" | 780 m || 
|}

555801–555900 

|-bgcolor=#d6d6d6
| 555801 ||  || — || March 20, 2002 || Kitt Peak || Kitt Peak Obs. || VER || align=right | 2.7 km || 
|-id=802 bgcolor=#fefefe
| 555802 ||  || — || June 6, 2007 || Lulin || LUSS || NYS || align=right data-sort-value="0.76" | 760 m || 
|-id=803 bgcolor=#fefefe
| 555803 ||  || — || September 22, 2008 || Kitt Peak || Spacewatch ||  || align=right data-sort-value="0.62" | 620 m || 
|-id=804 bgcolor=#fefefe
| 555804 ||  || — || January 26, 2007 || Kitt Peak || Spacewatch ||  || align=right data-sort-value="0.92" | 920 m || 
|-id=805 bgcolor=#fefefe
| 555805 ||  || — || June 27, 2011 || Siding Spring || SSS ||  || align=right data-sort-value="0.73" | 730 m || 
|-id=806 bgcolor=#fefefe
| 555806 ||  || — || November 22, 2005 || Kitt Peak || Spacewatch ||  || align=right data-sort-value="0.73" | 730 m || 
|-id=807 bgcolor=#d6d6d6
| 555807 ||  || — || January 31, 2013 || Kitt Peak || Spacewatch || 3:2 || align=right | 5.1 km || 
|-id=808 bgcolor=#d6d6d6
| 555808 ||  || — || March 8, 2014 || Mount Lemmon || Mount Lemmon Survey ||  || align=right | 2.1 km || 
|-id=809 bgcolor=#fefefe
| 555809 ||  || — || February 26, 2014 || Haleakala || Pan-STARRS ||  || align=right data-sort-value="0.68" | 680 m || 
|-id=810 bgcolor=#fefefe
| 555810 ||  || — || March 8, 2014 || Mount Lemmon || Mount Lemmon Survey ||  || align=right data-sort-value="0.65" | 650 m || 
|-id=811 bgcolor=#fefefe
| 555811 ||  || — || November 16, 2009 || Kitt Peak || Spacewatch ||  || align=right data-sort-value="0.84" | 840 m || 
|-id=812 bgcolor=#d6d6d6
| 555812 ||  || — || August 10, 2010 || XuYi || PMO NEO || Tj (2.99) || align=right | 3.5 km || 
|-id=813 bgcolor=#fefefe
| 555813 ||  || — || February 11, 2014 || Mount Lemmon || Mount Lemmon Survey ||  || align=right data-sort-value="0.65" | 650 m || 
|-id=814 bgcolor=#fefefe
| 555814 ||  || — || January 24, 2007 || Anderson Mesa || LONEOS || PHO || align=right data-sort-value="0.81" | 810 m || 
|-id=815 bgcolor=#fefefe
| 555815 ||  || — || April 22, 2011 || Kitt Peak || Spacewatch ||  || align=right data-sort-value="0.85" | 850 m || 
|-id=816 bgcolor=#fefefe
| 555816 ||  || — || August 10, 2005 || Mauna Kea || Mauna Kea Obs. ||  || align=right data-sort-value="0.94" | 940 m || 
|-id=817 bgcolor=#fefefe
| 555817 ||  || — || August 31, 2009 || Siding Spring || SSS ||  || align=right | 1.2 km || 
|-id=818 bgcolor=#fefefe
| 555818 ||  || — || September 19, 1998 || Apache Point || SDSS Collaboration ||  || align=right data-sort-value="0.75" | 750 m || 
|-id=819 bgcolor=#fefefe
| 555819 ||  || — || March 11, 2014 || Mount Lemmon || Mount Lemmon Survey ||  || align=right data-sort-value="0.99" | 990 m || 
|-id=820 bgcolor=#C2E0FF
| 555820 ||  || — || March 9, 2014 || Haleakala || Pan-STARRS || other TNO || align=right | 362 km || 
|-id=821 bgcolor=#d6d6d6
| 555821 ||  || — || January 24, 2007 || Mount Lemmon || Mount Lemmon Survey || 7:4 || align=right | 2.9 km || 
|-id=822 bgcolor=#fefefe
| 555822 ||  || — || January 29, 2007 || Kitt Peak || Spacewatch ||  || align=right data-sort-value="0.86" | 860 m || 
|-id=823 bgcolor=#d6d6d6
| 555823 ||  || — || November 14, 2012 || Mount Lemmon || Mount Lemmon Survey ||  || align=right | 1.7 km || 
|-id=824 bgcolor=#d6d6d6
| 555824 ||  || — || September 2, 2011 || Haleakala || Pan-STARRS ||  || align=right | 2.3 km || 
|-id=825 bgcolor=#fefefe
| 555825 ||  || — || October 11, 2012 || Haleakala || Pan-STARRS ||  || align=right data-sort-value="0.62" | 620 m || 
|-id=826 bgcolor=#fefefe
| 555826 ||  || — || February 28, 2014 || Haleakala || Pan-STARRS ||  || align=right data-sort-value="0.64" | 640 m || 
|-id=827 bgcolor=#fefefe
| 555827 ||  || — || October 19, 2012 || Haleakala || Pan-STARRS ||  || align=right data-sort-value="0.93" | 930 m || 
|-id=828 bgcolor=#d6d6d6
| 555828 ||  || — || July 4, 2016 || Haleakala || Pan-STARRS || 7:4 || align=right | 2.6 km || 
|-id=829 bgcolor=#fefefe
| 555829 ||  || — || September 5, 2008 || Kitt Peak || Spacewatch ||  || align=right data-sort-value="0.67" | 670 m || 
|-id=830 bgcolor=#fefefe
| 555830 ||  || — || September 16, 2012 || Mount Lemmon || Mount Lemmon Survey ||  || align=right data-sort-value="0.53" | 530 m || 
|-id=831 bgcolor=#fefefe
| 555831 ||  || — || December 29, 2005 || Mount Lemmon || Mount Lemmon Survey ||  || align=right data-sort-value="0.79" | 790 m || 
|-id=832 bgcolor=#fefefe
| 555832 ||  || — || August 30, 2005 || Kitt Peak || Spacewatch ||  || align=right data-sort-value="0.61" | 610 m || 
|-id=833 bgcolor=#fefefe
| 555833 ||  || — || November 9, 1999 || Socorro || LINEAR ||  || align=right data-sort-value="0.65" | 650 m || 
|-id=834 bgcolor=#E9E9E9
| 555834 ||  || — || February 14, 2010 || Mount Lemmon || Mount Lemmon Survey ||  || align=right data-sort-value="0.77" | 770 m || 
|-id=835 bgcolor=#fefefe
| 555835 ||  || — || January 29, 2014 || Kitt Peak || Spacewatch ||  || align=right data-sort-value="0.52" | 520 m || 
|-id=836 bgcolor=#d6d6d6
| 555836 ||  || — || September 17, 2006 || Kitt Peak || Spacewatch ||  || align=right | 2.6 km || 
|-id=837 bgcolor=#fefefe
| 555837 ||  || — || October 11, 2009 || Mount Lemmon || Mount Lemmon Survey ||  || align=right data-sort-value="0.60" | 600 m || 
|-id=838 bgcolor=#fefefe
| 555838 ||  || — || May 24, 2011 || Mount Lemmon || Mount Lemmon Survey ||  || align=right data-sort-value="0.74" | 740 m || 
|-id=839 bgcolor=#d6d6d6
| 555839 ||  || — || April 23, 2015 || Haleakala || Pan-STARRS ||  || align=right | 2.0 km || 
|-id=840 bgcolor=#fefefe
| 555840 ||  || — || September 30, 2005 || Mount Lemmon || Mount Lemmon Survey ||  || align=right data-sort-value="0.63" | 630 m || 
|-id=841 bgcolor=#d6d6d6
| 555841 ||  || — || May 20, 2015 || Mount Lemmon || Mount Lemmon Survey ||  || align=right | 2.8 km || 
|-id=842 bgcolor=#d6d6d6
| 555842 ||  || — || September 24, 2011 || Mount Lemmon || Mount Lemmon Survey ||  || align=right | 2.8 km || 
|-id=843 bgcolor=#C2FFFF
| 555843 ||  || — || September 6, 2008 || Kitt Peak || Spacewatch || L4 || align=right | 6.8 km || 
|-id=844 bgcolor=#d6d6d6
| 555844 ||  || — || April 24, 2003 || Kitt Peak || Spacewatch ||  || align=right | 2.8 km || 
|-id=845 bgcolor=#d6d6d6
| 555845 ||  || — || March 8, 2014 || Mount Lemmon || Mount Lemmon Survey ||  || align=right | 2.5 km || 
|-id=846 bgcolor=#fefefe
| 555846 ||  || — || March 7, 2014 || Mount Lemmon || Mount Lemmon Survey ||  || align=right data-sort-value="0.73" | 730 m || 
|-id=847 bgcolor=#fefefe
| 555847 ||  || — || February 28, 2014 || Mount Lemmon || Mount Lemmon Survey ||  || align=right data-sort-value="0.80" | 800 m || 
|-id=848 bgcolor=#fefefe
| 555848 ||  || — || July 28, 2008 || Mount Lemmon || Mount Lemmon Survey ||  || align=right data-sort-value="0.97" | 970 m || 
|-id=849 bgcolor=#fefefe
| 555849 ||  || — || January 28, 2003 || Palomar || NEAT ||  || align=right | 1.1 km || 
|-id=850 bgcolor=#fefefe
| 555850 ||  || — || February 26, 2014 || Haleakala || Pan-STARRS ||  || align=right data-sort-value="0.57" | 570 m || 
|-id=851 bgcolor=#fefefe
| 555851 ||  || — || May 22, 2001 || Cerro Tololo || J. L. Elliot, L. H. Wasserman ||  || align=right data-sort-value="0.94" | 940 m || 
|-id=852 bgcolor=#fefefe
| 555852 ||  || — || July 29, 2008 || Mount Lemmon || Mount Lemmon Survey ||  || align=right data-sort-value="0.67" | 670 m || 
|-id=853 bgcolor=#d6d6d6
| 555853 ||  || — || April 18, 2009 || Kitt Peak || Spacewatch ||  || align=right | 2.6 km || 
|-id=854 bgcolor=#fefefe
| 555854 ||  || — || February 17, 2007 || Mount Lemmon || Mount Lemmon Survey ||  || align=right data-sort-value="0.85" | 850 m || 
|-id=855 bgcolor=#fefefe
| 555855 ||  || — || December 4, 2012 || Mount Lemmon || Mount Lemmon Survey ||  || align=right data-sort-value="0.77" | 770 m || 
|-id=856 bgcolor=#fefefe
| 555856 ||  || — || November 20, 2009 || Kitt Peak || Spacewatch ||  || align=right data-sort-value="0.95" | 950 m || 
|-id=857 bgcolor=#fefefe
| 555857 ||  || — || November 1, 2005 || Mount Lemmon || Mount Lemmon Survey ||  || align=right | 1.00 km || 
|-id=858 bgcolor=#fefefe
| 555858 ||  || — || February 27, 2014 || Catalina || CSS ||  || align=right data-sort-value="0.87" | 870 m || 
|-id=859 bgcolor=#fefefe
| 555859 ||  || — || October 18, 2012 || Haleakala || Pan-STARRS ||  || align=right data-sort-value="0.63" | 630 m || 
|-id=860 bgcolor=#fefefe
| 555860 ||  || — || March 28, 2014 || Mount Lemmon || Mount Lemmon Survey ||  || align=right data-sort-value="0.57" | 570 m || 
|-id=861 bgcolor=#fefefe
| 555861 ||  || — || February 22, 2007 || Kitt Peak || Spacewatch ||  || align=right data-sort-value="0.53" | 530 m || 
|-id=862 bgcolor=#d6d6d6
| 555862 ||  || — || March 29, 2014 || Mount Lemmon || Mount Lemmon Survey ||  || align=right | 2.6 km || 
|-id=863 bgcolor=#fefefe
| 555863 ||  || — || March 12, 2014 || Haleakala || Pan-STARRS ||  || align=right data-sort-value="0.91" | 910 m || 
|-id=864 bgcolor=#d6d6d6
| 555864 ||  || — || February 8, 2002 || Kitt Peak || R. Millis, M. W. Buie || 7:4 || align=right | 2.9 km || 
|-id=865 bgcolor=#fefefe
| 555865 ||  || — || March 23, 2003 || Apache Point || SDSS Collaboration ||  || align=right data-sort-value="0.66" | 660 m || 
|-id=866 bgcolor=#fefefe
| 555866 ||  || — || October 22, 2012 || Haleakala || Pan-STARRS ||  || align=right data-sort-value="0.80" | 800 m || 
|-id=867 bgcolor=#fefefe
| 555867 ||  || — || November 23, 2009 || Mount Lemmon || Mount Lemmon Survey ||  || align=right data-sort-value="0.76" | 760 m || 
|-id=868 bgcolor=#fefefe
| 555868 ||  || — || March 4, 2014 || Haleakala || Pan-STARRS ||  || align=right data-sort-value="0.64" | 640 m || 
|-id=869 bgcolor=#fefefe
| 555869 ||  || — || October 21, 2012 || Haleakala || Pan-STARRS ||  || align=right data-sort-value="0.67" | 670 m || 
|-id=870 bgcolor=#fefefe
| 555870 ||  || — || September 3, 2008 || Kitt Peak || Spacewatch ||  || align=right data-sort-value="0.64" | 640 m || 
|-id=871 bgcolor=#fefefe
| 555871 ||  || — || March 24, 2014 || Haleakala || Pan-STARRS ||  || align=right data-sort-value="0.84" | 840 m || 
|-id=872 bgcolor=#fefefe
| 555872 ||  || — || November 17, 2009 || Mount Lemmon || Mount Lemmon Survey ||  || align=right data-sort-value="0.81" | 810 m || 
|-id=873 bgcolor=#fefefe
| 555873 ||  || — || March 26, 2007 || Mount Lemmon || Mount Lemmon Survey ||  || align=right data-sort-value="0.67" | 670 m || 
|-id=874 bgcolor=#d6d6d6
| 555874 ||  || — || January 10, 2013 || Haleakala || Pan-STARRS || 7:4 || align=right | 2.9 km || 
|-id=875 bgcolor=#fefefe
| 555875 ||  || — || November 4, 2012 || Mount Lemmon || Mount Lemmon Survey ||  || align=right data-sort-value="0.55" | 550 m || 
|-id=876 bgcolor=#fefefe
| 555876 ||  || — || February 28, 2014 || Haleakala || Pan-STARRS ||  || align=right data-sort-value="0.62" | 620 m || 
|-id=877 bgcolor=#fefefe
| 555877 ||  || — || September 3, 2008 || Kitt Peak || Spacewatch ||  || align=right data-sort-value="0.80" | 800 m || 
|-id=878 bgcolor=#fefefe
| 555878 ||  || — || May 6, 2011 || Kitt Peak || Spacewatch ||  || align=right data-sort-value="0.56" | 560 m || 
|-id=879 bgcolor=#fefefe
| 555879 ||  || — || January 29, 2014 || Mount Lemmon || Mount Lemmon Survey ||  || align=right data-sort-value="0.60" | 600 m || 
|-id=880 bgcolor=#fefefe
| 555880 ||  || — || February 28, 2014 || Haleakala || Pan-STARRS ||  || align=right data-sort-value="0.70" | 700 m || 
|-id=881 bgcolor=#fefefe
| 555881 ||  || — || March 14, 2007 || Kitt Peak || Spacewatch ||  || align=right data-sort-value="0.64" | 640 m || 
|-id=882 bgcolor=#fefefe
| 555882 ||  || — || March 9, 2003 || Anderson Mesa || LONEOS || V || align=right data-sort-value="0.76" | 760 m || 
|-id=883 bgcolor=#fefefe
| 555883 ||  || — || April 24, 2003 || Kitt Peak || Spacewatch || NYS || align=right data-sort-value="0.68" | 680 m || 
|-id=884 bgcolor=#fefefe
| 555884 ||  || — || February 28, 2014 || Haleakala || Pan-STARRS ||  || align=right data-sort-value="0.70" | 700 m || 
|-id=885 bgcolor=#fefefe
| 555885 ||  || — || October 20, 2008 || Mount Lemmon || Mount Lemmon Survey ||  || align=right data-sort-value="0.74" | 740 m || 
|-id=886 bgcolor=#fefefe
| 555886 ||  || — || November 5, 2005 || Kitt Peak || Spacewatch ||  || align=right data-sort-value="0.68" | 680 m || 
|-id=887 bgcolor=#fefefe
| 555887 ||  || — || March 26, 2007 || Kitt Peak || Spacewatch || V || align=right data-sort-value="0.55" | 550 m || 
|-id=888 bgcolor=#fefefe
| 555888 ||  || — || November 22, 2005 || Kitt Peak || Spacewatch ||  || align=right data-sort-value="0.58" | 580 m || 
|-id=889 bgcolor=#fefefe
| 555889 ||  || — || April 8, 2003 || Kitt Peak || Spacewatch || NYS || align=right data-sort-value="0.58" | 580 m || 
|-id=890 bgcolor=#fefefe
| 555890 ||  || — || March 11, 2003 || Palomar || NEAT || V || align=right data-sort-value="0.94" | 940 m || 
|-id=891 bgcolor=#fefefe
| 555891 ||  || — || October 2, 2008 || Mount Lemmon || Mount Lemmon Survey ||  || align=right data-sort-value="0.79" | 790 m || 
|-id=892 bgcolor=#fefefe
| 555892 ||  || — || March 7, 2003 || Palomar || NEAT ||  || align=right data-sort-value="0.96" | 960 m || 
|-id=893 bgcolor=#fefefe
| 555893 ||  || — || March 25, 2014 || Kitt Peak || Spacewatch ||  || align=right data-sort-value="0.89" | 890 m || 
|-id=894 bgcolor=#fefefe
| 555894 ||  || — || March 7, 2003 || St. Veran || Saint-Véran Obs. ||  || align=right data-sort-value="0.93" | 930 m || 
|-id=895 bgcolor=#fefefe
| 555895 ||  || — || August 26, 2012 || Haleakala || Pan-STARRS ||  || align=right data-sort-value="0.68" | 680 m || 
|-id=896 bgcolor=#d6d6d6
| 555896 ||  || — || December 12, 2012 || Mount Lemmon || Mount Lemmon Survey ||  || align=right | 2.6 km || 
|-id=897 bgcolor=#fefefe
| 555897 ||  || — || March 24, 2014 || Haleakala || Pan-STARRS ||  || align=right data-sort-value="0.90" | 900 m || 
|-id=898 bgcolor=#fefefe
| 555898 ||  || — || November 12, 2001 || Apache Point || SDSS Collaboration ||  || align=right | 1.0 km || 
|-id=899 bgcolor=#fefefe
| 555899 ||  || — || October 2, 2008 || Mount Lemmon || Mount Lemmon Survey ||  || align=right data-sort-value="0.60" | 600 m || 
|-id=900 bgcolor=#fefefe
| 555900 ||  || — || November 2, 2012 || Mount Lemmon || Mount Lemmon Survey ||  || align=right data-sort-value="0.72" | 720 m || 
|}

555901–556000 

|-bgcolor=#fefefe
| 555901 ||  || — || September 21, 2011 || Catalina || CSS ||  || align=right data-sort-value="0.74" | 740 m || 
|-id=902 bgcolor=#fefefe
| 555902 ||  || — || April 8, 2003 || Kitt Peak || Spacewatch ||  || align=right data-sort-value="0.56" | 560 m || 
|-id=903 bgcolor=#fefefe
| 555903 ||  || — || October 9, 2012 || Mount Lemmon || Mount Lemmon Survey ||  || align=right data-sort-value="0.87" | 870 m || 
|-id=904 bgcolor=#fefefe
| 555904 ||  || — || June 22, 2004 || Kitt Peak || Spacewatch ||  || align=right data-sort-value="0.79" | 790 m || 
|-id=905 bgcolor=#fefefe
| 555905 ||  || — || March 27, 2014 || Haleakala || Pan-STARRS ||  || align=right data-sort-value="0.84" | 840 m || 
|-id=906 bgcolor=#fefefe
| 555906 ||  || — || March 9, 2014 || Haleakala || Pan-STARRS ||  || align=right data-sort-value="0.76" | 760 m || 
|-id=907 bgcolor=#fefefe
| 555907 ||  || — || December 20, 2009 || Mount Lemmon || Mount Lemmon Survey ||  || align=right data-sort-value="0.87" | 870 m || 
|-id=908 bgcolor=#d6d6d6
| 555908 ||  || — || January 10, 2013 || Mount Lemmon || Pan-STARRS ||  || align=right | 3.3 km || 
|-id=909 bgcolor=#fefefe
| 555909 ||  || — || April 5, 2014 || Kitt Peak || Pan-STARRS ||  || align=right data-sort-value="0.66" | 660 m || 
|-id=910 bgcolor=#FA8072
| 555910 ||  || — || February 26, 2000 || Socorro || LINEAR ||  || align=right data-sort-value="0.76" | 760 m || 
|-id=911 bgcolor=#fefefe
| 555911 ||  || — || March 24, 2014 || Haleakala || Pan-STARRS ||  || align=right data-sort-value="0.68" | 680 m || 
|-id=912 bgcolor=#d6d6d6
| 555912 ||  || — || December 23, 2012 || Haleakala || Pan-STARRS ||  || align=right | 2.7 km || 
|-id=913 bgcolor=#fefefe
| 555913 ||  || — || October 23, 2012 || Haleakala || Pan-STARRS ||  || align=right data-sort-value="0.62" | 620 m || 
|-id=914 bgcolor=#fefefe
| 555914 ||  || — || December 15, 2009 || Catalina || CSS ||  || align=right data-sort-value="0.88" | 880 m || 
|-id=915 bgcolor=#C2E0FF
| 555915 ||  || — || April 12, 2002 || Palomar || NEAT || res7:11critical || align=right | 363 km || 
|-id=916 bgcolor=#C2E0FF
| 555916 ||  || — || April 4, 2014 || Haleakala || Pan-STARRS || plutinocritical || align=right | 120 km || 
|-id=917 bgcolor=#fefefe
| 555917 ||  || — || April 7, 2014 || Mount Lemmon || Mount Lemmon Survey ||  || align=right data-sort-value="0.71" | 710 m || 
|-id=918 bgcolor=#fefefe
| 555918 ||  || — || March 11, 2003 || Kitt Peak || Spacewatch ||  || align=right data-sort-value="0.73" | 730 m || 
|-id=919 bgcolor=#fefefe
| 555919 ||  || — || April 5, 2014 || Haleakala || Pan-STARRS ||  || align=right data-sort-value="0.89" | 890 m || 
|-id=920 bgcolor=#fefefe
| 555920 ||  || — || April 5, 2014 || Haleakala || Pan-STARRS ||  || align=right data-sort-value="0.56" | 560 m || 
|-id=921 bgcolor=#d6d6d6
| 555921 ||  || — || August 14, 2016 || Haleakala || Pan-STARRS ||  || align=right | 3.0 km || 
|-id=922 bgcolor=#fefefe
| 555922 ||  || — || April 4, 2014 || Haleakala || Pan-STARRS ||  || align=right data-sort-value="0.58" | 580 m || 
|-id=923 bgcolor=#E9E9E9
| 555923 ||  || — || April 10, 2014 || Haleakala || Pan-STARRS ||  || align=right data-sort-value="0.85" | 850 m || 
|-id=924 bgcolor=#d6d6d6
| 555924 ||  || — || April 5, 2014 || Haleakala || Pan-STARRS || KOR || align=right data-sort-value="0.99" | 990 m || 
|-id=925 bgcolor=#fefefe
| 555925 ||  || — || April 1, 2014 || Mount Lemmon || Mount Lemmon Survey ||  || align=right data-sort-value="0.65" | 650 m || 
|-id=926 bgcolor=#fefefe
| 555926 ||  || — || February 26, 2014 || Kitt Peak || Mount Lemmon Survey ||  || align=right data-sort-value="0.67" | 670 m || 
|-id=927 bgcolor=#fefefe
| 555927 ||  || — || April 21, 2014 || Elena Remote || A. Oreshko ||  || align=right data-sort-value="0.62" | 620 m || 
|-id=928 bgcolor=#fefefe
| 555928 ||  || — || January 7, 2010 || Kitt Peak || Spacewatch ||  || align=right data-sort-value="0.55" | 550 m || 
|-id=929 bgcolor=#fefefe
| 555929 ||  || — || August 3, 2011 || Cerro Burek || Alianza S4 Obs. ||  || align=right | 1.1 km || 
|-id=930 bgcolor=#FA8072
| 555930 ||  || — || October 22, 2011 || Kitt Peak || Spacewatch ||  || align=right data-sort-value="0.70" | 700 m || 
|-id=931 bgcolor=#fefefe
| 555931 ||  || — || March 15, 2007 || Kitt Peak || Spacewatch ||  || align=right data-sort-value="0.80" | 800 m || 
|-id=932 bgcolor=#fefefe
| 555932 ||  || — || August 24, 2011 || Haleakala || Pan-STARRS ||  || align=right data-sort-value="0.74" | 740 m || 
|-id=933 bgcolor=#fefefe
| 555933 ||  || — || December 23, 2006 || Mount Lemmon || Mount Lemmon Survey ||  || align=right data-sort-value="0.68" | 680 m || 
|-id=934 bgcolor=#fefefe
| 555934 ||  || — || February 25, 2007 || Mount Lemmon || Mount Lemmon Survey ||  || align=right data-sort-value="0.56" | 560 m || 
|-id=935 bgcolor=#fefefe
| 555935 ||  || — || April 4, 2014 || Haleakala || Pan-STARRS ||  || align=right data-sort-value="0.55" | 550 m || 
|-id=936 bgcolor=#fefefe
| 555936 ||  || — || April 21, 2014 || Mount Lemmon || Mount Lemmon Survey ||  || align=right data-sort-value="0.64" | 640 m || 
|-id=937 bgcolor=#fefefe
| 555937 ||  || — || October 15, 2004 || Mount Lemmon || Mount Lemmon Survey ||  || align=right data-sort-value="0.85" | 850 m || 
|-id=938 bgcolor=#fefefe
| 555938 ||  || — || August 30, 2011 || Haleakala || Pan-STARRS || V || align=right data-sort-value="0.57" | 570 m || 
|-id=939 bgcolor=#fefefe
| 555939 ||  || — || September 12, 2004 || Kitt Peak || Spacewatch ||  || align=right data-sort-value="0.60" | 600 m || 
|-id=940 bgcolor=#E9E9E9
| 555940 ||  || — || May 5, 2010 || Mount Lemmon || Mount Lemmon Survey ||  || align=right data-sort-value="0.79" | 790 m || 
|-id=941 bgcolor=#fefefe
| 555941 ||  || — || April 19, 2007 || Kitt Peak || Spacewatch ||  || align=right data-sort-value="0.56" | 560 m || 
|-id=942 bgcolor=#fefefe
| 555942 ||  || — || April 1, 2014 || Cerro Tololo || Mount Lemmon Survey ||  || align=right data-sort-value="0.73" | 730 m || 
|-id=943 bgcolor=#fefefe
| 555943 ||  || — || December 18, 2001 || Socorro || LINEAR ||  || align=right data-sort-value="0.89" | 890 m || 
|-id=944 bgcolor=#fefefe
| 555944 ||  || — || February 14, 2010 || Mount Lemmon || Mount Lemmon Survey ||  || align=right data-sort-value="0.96" | 960 m || 
|-id=945 bgcolor=#fefefe
| 555945 ||  || — || April 1, 2003 || Apache Point || SDSS Collaboration || V || align=right data-sort-value="0.82" | 820 m || 
|-id=946 bgcolor=#fefefe
| 555946 ||  || — || April 24, 2014 || Mount Lemmon || Mount Lemmon Survey ||  || align=right data-sort-value="0.71" | 710 m || 
|-id=947 bgcolor=#fefefe
| 555947 ||  || — || April 20, 2014 || Mount Lemmon || Mount Lemmon Survey ||  || align=right data-sort-value="0.66" | 660 m || 
|-id=948 bgcolor=#fefefe
| 555948 ||  || — || November 26, 2005 || Kitt Peak || Spacewatch ||  || align=right data-sort-value="0.50" | 500 m || 
|-id=949 bgcolor=#d6d6d6
| 555949 ||  || — || February 28, 2008 || Kitt Peak || Spacewatch ||  || align=right | 2.4 km || 
|-id=950 bgcolor=#fefefe
| 555950 ||  || — || September 11, 2005 || Kitt Peak || Spacewatch ||  || align=right data-sort-value="0.53" | 530 m || 
|-id=951 bgcolor=#d6d6d6
| 555951 ||  || — || April 23, 2014 || Cerro Tololo-DECam || CTIO-DECam ||  || align=right | 1.4 km || 
|-id=952 bgcolor=#fefefe
| 555952 ||  || — || April 23, 2014 || Cerro Tololo-DECam || CTIO-DECam ||  || align=right data-sort-value="0.67" | 670 m || 
|-id=953 bgcolor=#fefefe
| 555953 ||  || — || March 23, 2003 || Apache Point || SDSS Collaboration ||  || align=right data-sort-value="0.72" | 720 m || 
|-id=954 bgcolor=#fefefe
| 555954 ||  || — || April 23, 2014 || Cerro Tololo-DECam || CTIO-DECam ||  || align=right data-sort-value="0.71" | 710 m || 
|-id=955 bgcolor=#fefefe
| 555955 Lurçat ||  ||  || November 20, 2005 || Nogales || J.-C. Merlin ||  || align=right data-sort-value="0.52" | 520 m || 
|-id=956 bgcolor=#fefefe
| 555956 ||  || — || December 18, 2001 || Kitt Peak || Spacewatch ||  || align=right data-sort-value="0.55" | 550 m || 
|-id=957 bgcolor=#fefefe
| 555957 ||  || — || October 20, 2012 || Mount Lemmon || Mount Lemmon Survey ||  || align=right data-sort-value="0.58" | 580 m || 
|-id=958 bgcolor=#fefefe
| 555958 ||  || — || September 25, 2008 || Kitt Peak || Spacewatch ||  || align=right data-sort-value="0.53" | 530 m || 
|-id=959 bgcolor=#fefefe
| 555959 ||  || — || October 30, 2005 || Catalina || CSS ||  || align=right data-sort-value="0.52" | 520 m || 
|-id=960 bgcolor=#fefefe
| 555960 ||  || — || October 18, 2012 || Haleakala || Pan-STARRS ||  || align=right data-sort-value="0.48" | 480 m || 
|-id=961 bgcolor=#fefefe
| 555961 ||  || — || December 4, 2008 || Kitt Peak || Spacewatch ||  || align=right data-sort-value="0.94" | 940 m || 
|-id=962 bgcolor=#E9E9E9
| 555962 ||  || — || April 23, 2014 || Cerro Tololo-DECam || CTIO-DECam ||  || align=right | 1.2 km || 
|-id=963 bgcolor=#fefefe
| 555963 ||  || — || April 24, 2014 || Mount Lemmon || Mount Lemmon Survey ||  || align=right data-sort-value="0.68" | 680 m || 
|-id=964 bgcolor=#fefefe
| 555964 ||  || — || April 23, 2014 || Cerro Tololo-DECam || CTIO-DECam ||  || align=right data-sort-value="0.61" | 610 m || 
|-id=965 bgcolor=#fefefe
| 555965 ||  || — || March 27, 2003 || Kitt Peak || Spacewatch ||  || align=right data-sort-value="0.56" | 560 m || 
|-id=966 bgcolor=#fefefe
| 555966 ||  || — || February 28, 2014 || Haleakala || Pan-STARRS ||  || align=right data-sort-value="0.77" | 770 m || 
|-id=967 bgcolor=#E9E9E9
| 555967 ||  || — || October 20, 2007 || Kitt Peak || Mount Lemmon Survey ||  || align=right data-sort-value="0.86" | 860 m || 
|-id=968 bgcolor=#fefefe
| 555968 ||  || — || October 27, 2005 || Mount Lemmon || Mount Lemmon Survey ||  || align=right data-sort-value="0.81" | 810 m || 
|-id=969 bgcolor=#fefefe
| 555969 ||  || — || April 23, 2014 || Cerro Tololo-DECam || CTIO-DECam ||  || align=right data-sort-value="0.57" | 570 m || 
|-id=970 bgcolor=#fefefe
| 555970 ||  || — || April 4, 2003 || Kitt Peak || Spacewatch || MAS || align=right data-sort-value="0.58" | 580 m || 
|-id=971 bgcolor=#fefefe
| 555971 ||  || — || April 22, 2007 || Kitt Peak || Spacewatch ||  || align=right data-sort-value="0.59" | 590 m || 
|-id=972 bgcolor=#fefefe
| 555972 ||  || — || February 10, 2002 || Socorro || LINEAR ||  || align=right | 1.3 km || 
|-id=973 bgcolor=#fefefe
| 555973 ||  || — || December 3, 2012 || Mount Lemmon || Mount Lemmon Survey || PHO || align=right data-sort-value="0.93" | 930 m || 
|-id=974 bgcolor=#fefefe
| 555974 ||  || — || December 27, 2005 || Kitt Peak || Spacewatch ||  || align=right data-sort-value="0.82" | 820 m || 
|-id=975 bgcolor=#fefefe
| 555975 ||  || — || April 23, 2014 || Cerro Tololo-DECam || CTIO-DECam ||  || align=right data-sort-value="0.63" | 630 m || 
|-id=976 bgcolor=#fefefe
| 555976 ||  || — || October 18, 2012 || Haleakala || Pan-STARRS ||  || align=right data-sort-value="0.66" | 660 m || 
|-id=977 bgcolor=#fefefe
| 555977 ||  || — || August 23, 2011 || Haleakala || Pan-STARRS ||  || align=right data-sort-value="0.64" | 640 m || 
|-id=978 bgcolor=#fefefe
| 555978 ||  || — || November 4, 2005 || Mount Lemmon || Mount Lemmon Survey ||  || align=right data-sort-value="0.65" | 650 m || 
|-id=979 bgcolor=#fefefe
| 555979 ||  || — || February 9, 2007 || Mount Lemmon || Mount Lemmon Survey ||  || align=right data-sort-value="0.80" | 800 m || 
|-id=980 bgcolor=#fefefe
| 555980 ||  || — || March 13, 2007 || Kitt Peak || Spacewatch ||  || align=right data-sort-value="0.54" | 540 m || 
|-id=981 bgcolor=#fefefe
| 555981 ||  || — || March 13, 2003 || Kitt Peak || Spacewatch ||  || align=right data-sort-value="0.71" | 710 m || 
|-id=982 bgcolor=#fefefe
| 555982 ||  || — || March 20, 2007 || Kitt Peak || Spacewatch ||  || align=right data-sort-value="0.65" | 650 m || 
|-id=983 bgcolor=#fefefe
| 555983 ||  || — || March 9, 2014 || Haleakala || Pan-STARRS ||  || align=right data-sort-value="0.71" | 710 m || 
|-id=984 bgcolor=#fefefe
| 555984 ||  || — || October 8, 2012 || Haleakala || Pan-STARRS ||  || align=right data-sort-value="0.81" | 810 m || 
|-id=985 bgcolor=#fefefe
| 555985 ||  || — || February 19, 2010 || Mount Lemmon || Mount Lemmon Survey ||  || align=right data-sort-value="0.80" | 800 m || 
|-id=986 bgcolor=#fefefe
| 555986 ||  || — || March 15, 2007 || Mount Lemmon || Mount Lemmon Survey ||  || align=right data-sort-value="0.56" | 560 m || 
|-id=987 bgcolor=#fefefe
| 555987 ||  || — || October 21, 2012 || Haleakala || Pan-STARRS ||  || align=right data-sort-value="0.62" | 620 m || 
|-id=988 bgcolor=#fefefe
| 555988 ||  || — || March 28, 2014 || Kitt Peak || Spacewatch ||  || align=right data-sort-value="0.66" | 660 m || 
|-id=989 bgcolor=#fefefe
| 555989 ||  || — || November 19, 2012 || Kitt Peak || Spacewatch ||  || align=right data-sort-value="0.62" | 620 m || 
|-id=990 bgcolor=#fefefe
| 555990 ||  || — || December 23, 2012 || Haleakala || Pan-STARRS ||  || align=right data-sort-value="0.79" | 790 m || 
|-id=991 bgcolor=#fefefe
| 555991 ||  || — || July 28, 2011 || Apache Point || Pan-STARRS ||  || align=right data-sort-value="0.74" | 740 m || 
|-id=992 bgcolor=#d6d6d6
| 555992 ||  || — || May 15, 2009 || Mount Lemmon || Mount Lemmon Survey ||  || align=right | 1.9 km || 
|-id=993 bgcolor=#fefefe
| 555993 ||  || — || April 29, 2014 || Haleakala || Pan-STARRS ||  || align=right data-sort-value="0.69" | 690 m || 
|-id=994 bgcolor=#fefefe
| 555994 ||  || — || March 13, 2007 || Kitt Peak || Spacewatch ||  || align=right data-sort-value="0.55" | 550 m || 
|-id=995 bgcolor=#d6d6d6
| 555995 ||  || — || April 29, 2014 || Mount Lemmon || Mount Lemmon Survey || Tj (2.98) || align=right | 3.6 km || 
|-id=996 bgcolor=#fefefe
| 555996 ||  || — || February 16, 2010 || Mount Lemmon || Mount Lemmon Survey ||  || align=right data-sort-value="0.71" | 710 m || 
|-id=997 bgcolor=#d6d6d6
| 555997 ||  || — || September 6, 2008 || Kitt Peak || Spacewatch || 3:2 || align=right | 4.1 km || 
|-id=998 bgcolor=#fefefe
| 555998 ||  || — || September 7, 2011 || Kitt Peak || Spacewatch || NYS || align=right data-sort-value="0.58" | 580 m || 
|-id=999 bgcolor=#fefefe
| 555999 ||  || — || April 25, 2014 || Mount Lemmon || Mount Lemmon Survey || V || align=right data-sort-value="0.59" | 590 m || 
|-id=000 bgcolor=#fefefe
| 556000 ||  || — || April 24, 2014 || Mount Lemmon || Mount Lemmon Survey ||  || align=right data-sort-value="0.65" | 650 m || 
|}

References

External links 
 Discovery Circumstances: Numbered Minor Planets (555001)–(560000) (IAU Minor Planet Center)

0555